This is a list of Singapore-related articles by alphabetical order. To learn quickly what Singapore is, see Outline of Singapore. Those interested in the subject can monitor changes to the pages by clicking on Related changes in the sidebar. A list of to do topics can be found here.

0-9

 .sg
 100plus
 10th Parliament of Singapore
 111 Somerset
 111 Squadron, Republic of Singapore Air Force
 117th IOC Session
 118 (TV series)
 118 II
 11th Parliament of Singapore
 12 Storeys
 120 Squadron, Republic of Singapore Air Force
 121 Squadron, Republic of Singapore Air Force
 125 Squadron, Republic of Singapore Air Force
 126 Squadron, Republic of Singapore Air Force
 127 Squadron, Republic of Singapore Air Force
 128 Circle
 12th Parliament of Singapore
 13th IIFA Awards
 13th Parliament of Singapore
 140 Squadron, Republic of Singapore Air Force
 142 Squadron, Republic of Singapore Air Force
 143 Squadron, Republic of Singapore Air Force
 144 Squadron, Republic of Singapore Air Force
 145 Squadron, Republic of Singapore Air Force
 149 Squadron, Republic of Singapore Air Force
 14th Parliament of Singapore
 15 (film)
 16 Collyer Quay
 165 Squadron, Republic of Singapore Air Force
 16th Annual Honda Civic Tour
 18-point agreement
 1819 Singapore Treaty
 1819 in Singapore
 1823 in Singapore
 1824 in Singapore
 1889 Singapore Municipal Commission election
 1892 Singapore Amateur Football Association Challenge Cup
 1893 Singapore Amateur Football Association Challenge Cup
 1894 Singapore Amateur Football Association Challenge Cup
 1895 Singapore Amateur Football Association Challenge Cup
 1915 Singapore Mutiny
 1929 Singapore Open
 1930 Singapore Open
 1931 Singapore Open
 1932 Singapore Open
 1933 Singapore Open
 1934 Singapore Open
 1935 Singapore Open
 1936 Singapore Open
 1937 Singapore Open
 1938 Singapore Open
 1939 Singapore Open
 1940 Singapore Open
 1941 Singapore Open
 1947 Singapore Open
 1948 Rural West by-election
 1948 Singapore Open
 1948 Singaporean general election
 1949 Singapore Open
 1950 Singapore Municipal Commission election
 1950 Singapore Open
 1950 in Singapore
 1951 Singapore City Council election
 1951 Singapore Open
 1951 Singaporean general election
 1952 Seletar by-election
 1952 Singapore City Council election
 1952 Singapore Open
 1952 Thomas Cup
 1953 Singapore City Council election
 1953 Singapore Open
 1954 BOAC Lockheed Constellation crash
 1954 National Service riots
 1954 Singapore Open
 1954 in Singapore
 1955 Singapore Open
 1955 Singaporean general election
 1955 Thomas Cup
 1955 in Singapore
 1956 Singapore Open
 1956 in Singapore
 1957 Singapore City Council election
 1957 Singapore Open
 1957 Singaporean by-elections
 1957 in Singapore
 1958 Singapore City Council by-election
 1958 Singapore Open
 1958 Thomas Cup
 1958 in Singapore
 1959 PAP prime ministerial election
 1959 Singapore Open
 1959 Singaporean general election
 1959 in Singapore
 1960 AFC Asian Cup qualification
 1960 Singapore Open
 1960 in Singapore
 1961 Singapore Open
 1961 Singaporean by-elections
 1961 in Singapore
 1962 Singapore Open
 1962 Singaporean integration referendum
 1962 in Singapore
 1963 Singapore Open
 1963 Singaporean general election
 1963 in Singapore
 1964 Singapore Open
 1964 in Singapore
 1964 race riots in Singapore
 1965 (film)
 1965 Hong Lim by-election
 1965 Singapore Open
 1965 in Singapore
 1966 Singapore Grand Prix
 1966 Singapore Open
 1966 Singaporean by-elections
 1966 in Singapore
 1967 Singapore Open
 1967 Singaporean by-elections
 1967 Singaporean presidential election
 1967 in Singapore
 1968 Singapore Open
 1968 Singaporean general election
 1968 in Singapore
 1969 Singapore Open
 1969 World Cup (men's golf)
 1969 in Singapore
 1969 race riots of Singapore
 1970 Singapore Open
 1970 Singaporean by-elections
 1970 Singaporean presidential election
 1970 in Singapore
 1971 Asian Cycling Championships
 1971 Commonwealth Heads of Government Meeting
 1971 Singapore Open
 1971 in Singapore
 1972 Pulau Ubin murder
 1972 Robinsons department store fire
 1972 Singapore Grand Prix
 1972 Singapore Open
 1972 Singaporean general election
 1972 in Singapore
 1973 Singapore Grand Prix
 1973 Singapore Open
 1973 Southeast Asian Peninsular Games
 1973 in Singapore
 1974 Singaporean presidential election
 1974 in Singapore
 1975 in Singapore
 1976 Singaporean general election
 1976 in Singapore
 1977 Singaporean by-elections
 1977 in Singapore
 1978 Singapore flood
 1978 Singaporean presidential election
 1978 in Singapore
 1979 Singaporean by-elections
 1979 in Singapore
 1980 Singaporean general election
 1980 in Singapore
 1981 Anson by-election
 1981 Singaporean presidential election
 1981 in Singapore
 1982 ARFU Asian Rugby Championship
 1982 Asian Taekwondo Championships
 1982 Merlion Cup
 1982 in Singapore
 1983 Southeast Asian Games
 1983 World Netball Championships
 1983 in Singapore
 1984 AFC Asian Cup
 1984 AFC Asian Cup Final
 1984 Merlion Cup
 1984 Singapore Masters
 1984 Singaporean general election
 1984 in Singapore
 1985 Singapore Masters
 1985 Singaporean presidential election
 1985 in Singapore
 1986 Singapore Women's Open
 1986 in Singapore
 1987 Asian Athletics Championships
 1987 Singapore Open
 1987 Singapore Women's Open
 1987 in Singapore
 1988 Asian Junior Athletics Championships
 1988 Singapore Open (badminton)
 1988 Singapore Open – Doubles (women's tennis)
 1988 Singapore Open – Singles (women's tennis)
 1988 Singaporean general election
 1988 WTA Singapore Open
 1988 in Singapore
 1989 DHL Open
 1989 DHL Open – Doubles
 1989 DHL Open – Singles
 1989 Men's World Team Squash Championships
 1989 Singapore Open
 1989 Singapore Open (badminton)
 1989 Singapore Open – Doubles
 1989 Singapore Open – Singles
 1989 Singaporean presidential election
 1989 World Badminton Grand Prix Finals
 1989 in Singapore
 1990 ABC Championship for Women
 1990 DHL Singapore Open
 1990 DHL Singapore Open – Doubles
 1990 DHL Singapore Open – Singles
 1990 Singapore Open
 1990 in Singapore
 1991 Paris Peace Agreements
 1991 Singapore Open
 1991 Singaporean general election
 1991 in Singapore
 1992 Marine Parade by-election
 1992 Singapore Open
 1992 in Singapore
 1993 Singaporean presidential election
 1993 Southeast Asian Games
 1993 in Singapore
 1994 FAS Premier League
 1994 Singapore Classic
 1994 Singapore Classic – Doubles
 1994 Singapore Classic – Singles
 1994 Singapore Open
 1994 in Singapore
 1995 Singapore Open
 1995 World Badminton Grand Prix Finals
 1995 in Singapore
 1995–96 Singer Cup
 1996 AFC Asian Cup qualification
 1996 AFF Championship
 1996 Asian Table Tennis Championships
 1996 Bedok Reservoir flat murder
 1996 Geylang United FC season
 1996 S.League
 1996 Singapore Open (tennis)
 1996 Singapore Open – Doubles
 1996 Singapore Open – Singles
 1996 in Singapore
 1997 Asian financial crisis
 1997 Indonesian forest fires
 1997 S.League
 1997 Singapore League Cup
 1997 Singapore Open
 1997 Singaporean general election
 1997 Southeast Asian haze
 1997 in Singapore
 1997 landlady murder
 1998 AFF Championship qualification
 1998 ARFU Asian Rugby Championship
 1998 S.League
 1998 Singapore Open
 1998 Singapore Open (badminton)
 1998 Singapore Open – Doubles
 1998 Singapore Open – Singles
 1998 Tampines flat murder
 1998 in Singapore
 1998–1999 Malaysia Nipah virus outbreak
 1999 Asian Junior Athletics Championships
 1999 Asian Karate Championships
 1999 Asian Youth Girls Volleyball Championship
 1999 S.League
 1999 Singapore Challenge
 1999 Singapore Open
 1999 Singaporean presidential election
 1999 in Singapore
 1:99 Concert
 1Malaysia Development Berhad scandal
 1st Legislative Assembly of Singapore
 1st Malaya Infantry Brigade
 1st Parliament of Singapore
 20-point agreement
 2000 S.League
 2000 Singapore Challenge
 2000 in Singapore
 2001 Badminton Asia Cup
 2001 S.League
 2001 Singapore Open (badminton)
 2001 Singaporean general election
 2001 in Singapore
 2002 ACC Trophy
 2002 AFF Championship
 2002 AFF Championship squads
 2002 Hassanal Bolkiah Trophy
 2002 S.League
 2002 Singapore Open (badminton)
 2002 in Singapore
 2002–2004 SARS outbreak
 2002–2004 SARS outbreak among healthcare workers
 2003 S.League
 2003 Singapore Open
 2003 in Singapore
 2004 S.League
 2004 Singapore Open
 2004 in Singapore
 2005 Hassanal Bolkiah Trophy
 2005 Lexus Cup
 2005 S.League
 2005 Singapore Open
 2005 Singaporean presidential election
 2005 dengue outbreak in Singapore
 2005 in Singapore
 2006 AFC U-17 Championship
 2006 ARFU Women's Rugby Championship
 2006 FIBA Asia Under-20 Championship for Women
 2006 Lexus Cup
 2006 S.League
 2006 Singapore Open
 2006 Singapore elitism controversy
 2006 Singaporean general election
 2006 Southeast Asian haze
 2006 in Singapore
 2006–07 Singapore Slingers season
 2006–2007 Southeast Asian floods
 2007 AFF Championship
 2007 ARFU Women's Rugby Championship
 2007 Hassanal Bolkiah Trophy
 2007 S.League
 2007 SEABA Championship for Women
 2007 Singapore League Cup
 2007 Singapore Super Series
 2007 in Singapore
 2007–08 Singapore Slingers season
 2008 AFF Championship
 2008 ARFU Women's Rugby Championship
 2008 Asian Junior and Cadet Table Tennis Championships
 2008 Geylang United FC season
 2008 Lexus Cup
 2008 S.League
 2008 Singapore Armed Forces FC season
 2008 Singapore Cup
 2008 Singapore Grand Prix
 2008 Singapore League Cup
 2008 Singapore Super Series
 2008 in Singapore
 2009 Asian Five Nations
 2009 Asian Youth Games
 2009 Geylang United FC season
 2009 Men's Hockey Junior World Cup
 2009 Prime League
 2009 S.League
 2009 SEABA Championship
 2009 Singapore Cup
 2009 Singapore Grand Prix
 2009 Singapore League Cup
 2009 Singapore Romanian diplomat incident
 2009 Singapore Super Series
 2009 Singapore national football team results
 2009 Southeast Asian haze
 2009 in Singapore
 2009–10 ABL season
 2010 AFF Championship
 2010 FIFA World Cup qualification – AFC second round
 2010 Geylang United FC season
 2010 Kallang slashing
 2010 Men's Asia Pacific Floorball Championships
 2010 Men's World Floorball Championships qualifying
 2010 Pan American Youth Championship (boys' field hockey)
 2010 Pan American Youth Championship (girls' field hockey)
 2010 S.League
 2010 SEABA Championship for Women
 2010 Singapore Cup
 2010 Singapore Grand Prix
 2010 Singapore League Cup
 2010 Singapore Super Series
 2010 Singapore train depot trespass and vandalism case
 2010 Southeast Asian haze
 2010 Summer Youth Olympics
 2010 Summer Youth Olympics medal table
 2010 Summer Youth Olympics torch relay
 2010 Woodlands Wellington FC season
 2010 in Singapore
 2010–11 ABL season
 2010–11 Singapore Slingers season
 2011 Extreme Sailing Series
 2011 Geylang United FC season
 2011 Home United FC season
 2011 Mnet Asian Music Awards
 2011 S.League
 2011 SEABA Championship
 2011 Singapore ATP Challenger
 2011 Singapore ATP Challenger – Doubles
 2011 Singapore ATP Challenger – Singles
 2011 Singapore Cup
 2011 Singapore Grand Prix
 2011 Singapore League Cup
 2011 Singapore Super Series
 2011 Singapore Women's Tennis Exhibition
 2011 Singaporean general election
 2011 Singaporean presidential election
 2011 Woodlands Wellington FC season
 2011 World Netball Championships
 2011 Zee Cine Awards
 2011 in ONE Championship
 2011 in Singapore
 2012 ABL season
 2012 ARFU Development Cup
 2012 Asian Tour
 2012 Clash of Continents Exhibition
 2012 Geylang United FC season
 2012 Hassanal Bolkiah Trophy
 2012 Hassanal Bolkiah Trophy squads
 2012 Home United FC season
 2012 Hougang by-election
 2012 ICC World Cricket League Division Five
 2012 Lion City Cup
 2012 LionsXII season
 2012 Marina Bay GP2 Series round
 2012 S.League
 2012 SEABA Cup
 2012 SEABA Under-18 Championship
 2012 Singapore ATP Challenger
 2012 Singapore ATP Challenger – Doubles
 2012 Singapore ATP Challenger – Singles
 2012 Singapore Cup
 2012 Singapore Grand Prix
 2012 Singapore League Cup
 2012 Singapore Slingers season
 2012 Singapore Super Series
 2012 Tampines Rovers FC season
 2012 Woodlands Wellington FC season
 2012 in ONE Championship
 2012 in Singapore
 2013 ABL season
 2013 Asia Women's Four Nations
 2013 Discovery Women's Basketball Invitational
 2013 Extreme Sailing Series
 2013 Geylang International FC season
 2013 Home United FC season
 2013 Lion City Cup
 2013 LionsXII season
 2013 Little India riot
 2013 Marina Bay GP2 Series round
 2013 Merdeka Tournament
 2013 Piala Emas Raja–Raja
 2013 Punggol East by-election
 2013 S.League
 2013 SEABA Championship
 2013 Singapore Cup
 2013 Singapore Grand Prix
 2013 Singapore League Cup
 2013 Singapore Super Series
 2013 Singapore cyberattacks
 2013 Southeast Asian haze
 2013 Tampines Rovers FC season
 2013 Woodlands Wellington FC season
 2013 dengue outbreak in Singapore
 2013 in ONE Championship
 2013 in Singapore
 2013 in Singaporean football
 2014 ABL season
 2014 ACC Elite League
 2014 AFF Championship
 2014 AFF Championship qualification
 2014 AFF Championship squads
 2014 AFF U-19 Women's Championship
 2014 Albirex Niigata Singapore FC season
 2014 Asian Men's Softball Championship
 2014 Asian Netball Championships
 2014 Extreme Sailing Series
 2014 Geylang International FC season
 2014 Hassanal Bolkiah Trophy
 2014 Hassanal Bolkiah Trophy squads
 2014 Home United FC season
 2014 ICC World Cricket League Division Four
 2014 League of Legends World Championship
 2014 LionsXII season
 2014 Prime League
 2014 S.League
 2014 SEABA Championship for Women
 2014 SEABA Cup
 2014 SEABA Under-18 Championship
 2014 SEABA Under-18 Championship for Women
 2014 Singapore Charity Shield
 2014 Singapore Cup
 2014 Singapore Darts Masters
 2014 Singapore Grand Prix
 2014 Singapore League Cup
 2014 Singapore Slammers season
 2014 Singapore Super Series
 2014 Southeast Asian Floorball Championships
 2014 Tampines Rovers FC season
 2014 WTA Finals
 2014 Warriors FC season
 2014 in ONE Championship
 2014 in Singapore
 2014 in Singaporean football
 2014–15 Men's FIH Hockey World League Round 2
 2015 ASEAN Para Games
 2015 Albirex Niigata Singapore FC season
 2015 Asian Fencing Championships
 2015 Bangabandhu Cup
 2015 Extreme Sailing Series
 2015 FINA World Junior Swimming Championships
 2015 Geylang International FC season
 2015 Home United FC season
 2015 Hougang United FC season
 2015 POMIS Cup
 2015 Premier League Asia Trophy
 2015 S.League
 2015 SEABA Championship
 2015 SEABA Championship squads
 2015 Singapore Charity Shield
 2015 Singapore Cup
 2015 Singapore Grand Prix
 2015 Singapore League Cup
 2015 Singapore Super Series
 2015 Singapore Super Series Qualification
 2015 Singaporean general election
 2015 Southeast Asian Games
 2015 Southeast Asian Games opening ceremony
 2015 Southeast Asian haze
 2015 TCR International Series Singapore round
 2015 Tampines Rovers FC season
 2015 U-19 Asia Rugby Championship
 2015 Voluntary non-work day
 2015 WTA Finals
 2015 Warriors FC season
 2015 in ONE Championship
 2015 in Singapore
 2015–16 ABL season
 2015–16 Zika virus epidemic
 2016 ASEAN University Games
 2016 AYA Bank Cup
 2016 Balestier Khalsa FC season
 2016 Bukit Batok by-election
 2016 Geylang International FC season
 2016 Geylang stabbing death
 2016 Home United FC season
 2016 Hougang United FC season
 2016 Merlion Cup (basketball)
 2016 S.League
 2016 SEABA Championship for Women
 2016 SEABA Cup
 2016 SEABA Under-18 Championship
 2016 Singapore Community Shield
 2016 Singapore Cup
 2016 Singapore Grand Prix
 2016 Singapore League Cup
 2016 Singapore Sevens
 2016 Singapore Super Series
 2016 Southeast Asian haze
 2016 Standard Chartered bank robbery
 2016 TCR International Series Singapore round
 2016 Tampines Rovers FC season
 2016 Toa Payoh child abuse case
 2016 WTA Finals
 2016 Warriors FC season
 2016 Women's Asian Champions Trophy
 2016 in ONE Championship
 2016 in Singapore
 2016–17 ABL season
 2017 Albirex Niigata Singapore FC season
 2017 Balestier Khalsa season
 2017 DPMM FC season
 2017 Eunos Crescent FC season
 2017 Garena Young Lions FC season
 2017 Geylang International FC season
 2017 Home United FC season
 2017 Hougang United FC season
 2017 International Champions Cup
 2017 Merlion Cup (basketball)
 2017 S.League
 2017 Singapore Community Shield
 2017 Singapore Cup
 2017 Singapore Grand Prix
 2017 Singapore League Cup
 2017 Singapore Sevens
 2017 Singapore Super Series
 2017 Singaporean presidential election
 2017 South East Asian Junior and Cadet Table Tennis Championships
 2017 Southeast Asian haze
 2017 Tampines Rovers FC season
 2017 WTA Finals
 2017 Warriors FC season
 2017 World Women's Snooker Championship
 2017 in ONE Championship
 2017 in Singapore
 2017–18 ABL season
 2018 AFF Championship
 2018 Albirex Niigata Singapore FC season
 2018 Asia Rugby Sevens Series
 2018 Asian Netball Championships
 2018 Balestier Khalsa season
 2018 DPMM FC season
 2018 Garena Young Lions FC season
 2018 Geylang International FC season
 2018 Hassanal Bolkiah Trophy
 2018 Hassanal Bolkiah Trophy squads
 2018 Home United FC season
 2018 Hougang United FC season
 2018 International Champions Cup
 2018 Netball New Zealand Super Club
 2018 North Korea–United States Singapore Summit
 2018 SingHealth data breach
 2018 Singapore Cup
 2018 Singapore Grand Prix
 2018 Singapore National Football League
 2018 Singapore Open (badminton)
 2018 Singapore Premier League
 2018 Singapore Sevens
 2018 Tampines Rovers FC season
 2018 WTA Finals
 2018 Warriors FC season
 2018 in ONE Championship
 2018 in Singapore
 2018–19 ABL season
 2019 Albirex Niigata Singapore FC season
 2019 Balestier Khalsa FC season
 2019 DPMM FC season
 2019 FINA Water Polo Challengers' Cup
 2019 Garena Young Lions FC season
 2019 Geylang International FC season
 2019 Home United FC season
 2019 Hougang United FC season
 2019 International Champions Cup
 2019 M1 Nations Cup
 2019 Merlion Cup
 2019 Orchard Towers murder
 2019 Saudari Cup
 2019 Singapore Cup
 2019 Singapore Grand Prix
 2019 Singapore National Football League
 2019 Singapore Open (badminton)
 2019 Singapore Premier League
 2019 Singapore Sevens
 2019 Southeast Asian haze
 2019 Tampines Rovers FC season
 2019 Warriors FC season
 2019 Women's Junior AHF Cup
 2019 in ONE Championship
 2019 in Singapore
 2019–20 ABL season
 2019–20 Singapore Tri-Nation Series
 2020 AFF Championship
 2020 Albirex Niigata Singapore FC season
 2020 Balestier Khalsa FC season
 2020 DPMM FC season
 2020 Garena Young Lions FC season
 2020 Geylang International FC season
 2020 Hougang United FC season
 2020 IIHF Challenge Cup of Asia
 2020 Lion City Sailors FC season
 2020 Love You Love You
 2020 Singapore Community Shield
 2020 Singapore Premier League
 2020 Singaporean general election
 2020 Tampines Rovers FC season
 2020 Tanjong Pagar United FC season
 2020 Warriors FC season
 2020 dengue outbreak in Singapore
 2020 in ONE Championship
 2020 in Singapore
 2020–21 Singapore circuit breaker measures
 2021 Albirex Niigata Singapore FC season
 2021 Balestier Khalsa FC season
 2021 Garena Young Lions FC season
 2021 Geylang International FC season
 2021 Hougang United FC season
 2021 Lion City Sailors F.C. season
 2021 Singapore Grand Prix
 2021 Singapore Premier League
 2021 Singapore Tennis Open
 2021 Tampines Rovers FC season
 2021 Tanjong Pagar United FC season
 2021 amendment to the Constitution of Malaysia
 2021 in ONE Championship
 2021 in Singapore
 2022 AFF Championship
 2022 Albirex Niigata Singapore FC season
 2022 Asian Netball Championships
 2022 Balestier Khalsa FC season
 2022 FAS Tri-Nations Series
 2022 FAS Tri-Nations Series squads
 2022 FIBA 3x3 Asia Cup
 2022 Garena Young Lions FC season
 2022 Geylang International FC season
 2022 Hougang United FC season
 2022 Lion City Sailors F.C. season
 2022 Saudari Cup
 2022 Singapore Cup
 2022 Singapore Football League
 2022 Singapore Grand Prix
 2022 Singapore Open (badminton)
 2022 Singapore Premier League
 2022 Singapore W Series round
 2022 Tampines Rovers FC season
 2022 Tanjong Pagar United FC season
 2022 VFF Tri-Nations Series
 2022 in ONE Championship
 2022 in Singapore
 2022–2023 monkeypox outbreak in Singapore
 2023 Albirex Niigata Singapore FC season
 2023 Balestier Khalsa FC season
 2023 DPMM FC season
 2023 Garena Young Lions FC season
 2023 Geylang International FC season
 2023 Hougang United FC season
 2023 Lion City Sailors F.C. season
 2023 Singapore Grand Prix
 2023 Singapore Premier League
 2023 Singaporean presidential election
 2023 Tampines Rovers FC season
 2023 Tanjong Pagar United FC season
 2023 in ONE Championship
 2023 in Singapore
 23:59 (film)
 23:59: The Haunting Hour
 24 (2021 film)
 2589 Days Apart
 2nd Legislative Assembly of Singapore
 2nd Malaya Infantry Brigade
 2nd Parliament of Singapore
 2nd People's Defence Force
 3 Peas in a Pod
 34 Whampoa West
 3688
 38 Oxley Road
 3DO Blaster
 3Dlabs
 3rd Legislative Assembly of Singapore
 3rd Parliament of Singapore
 3rd Singapore Division
 3x3 basketball at the 2009 Asian Youth Games
 4-Digits
 497th Combat Training Flight
 4:30
 4Fingers Crispy Chicken
 4th Parliament of Singapore
 53 Lorong 5 Toa Payoh
 53A (band)
 5th Parliament of Singapore
 5th Passage
 600 @ Toa Payoh
 6th Parliament of Singapore
 6th Singapore Division
 7 Letters
 7-Eleven
 77th Street (clothing)
 78 Moh Guan Terrace
 7th Parliament of Singapore
 8 Days (magazine)
 85th Anti-Tank Regiment, Royal Artillery
 881 (film)
 883Jia
 8th Division (Australia)
 8th Parliament of Singapore
 8world
 90' Now
 96°C Café
 987FM
 9th Parliament of Singapore
 9th Singapore Division

A

 A Blessed Life
 A Child's Hope
 A Dance of Moths
 A Gesture Life
 A Head Full of Dreams Tour
 A Land Imagined
 A Life of Hope
 A Many-Splendoured Thing
 A Million Dollar Dream
 A Million Treasures
 A Mobile Love Story
 A Month of Hungry Ghosts
 A New Life (Singaporean TV series)
 A Noodle Story
 A Perfect Day (album)
 A Promise for Tomorrow
 A Quest to Heal
 A River of Roses
 A Romance in Shanghai
 A Song to Remember (TV series)
 A Tale of 2 Cities
 A Toast of Love
 A Vacant Affair
 A War Diary
 A Wicked Tale
 A Yellow Bird
 A gURLs wURLd
 A-do
 A. J. Mandani
 A1 Team Singapore
 ABC DJ
 ABR Holdings
 ACRES v Tan Boon Kwee
 ACS Jakarta
 AGH Rostrum Club at Changi
 AH143
 AIBI International
 ALYPH
 AMK Hub
 AMP Singapore
 ANZUK
 APEC Singapore 2009
 APL Logistics
 APL Raffles
 APT Satellite Holdings
 ARCT-021
 ASEAN (cable system)
 ASEAN Agreement on Transboundary Haze Pollution
 ASEAN Charter
 ASEAN Declaration
 ASEAN Free Trade Area
 ASEAN–China Free Trade Agreement
 ASEAN–China Free Trade Area
 AXA Tower
 Aalst Chocolate
 Aaram Arivu
 Aarish Kumar
 Aaron Aziz
 Aaron Beng
 Aaron Lee
 Aaron Maniam
 Aaron Trahair
 Ab Osterhaus
 Abacus seeds
 Aban Pearl
 Abbas Abu Amin
 Abbas Akbar
 Abbas Saad
 Abdelaziz Dnibi
 Abdelhadi Laakkad
 Abdil Qaiyyim Mutalib
 Abdoulaye Djibril Diallo
 Abdul Dayyan Jaffar
 Abdul Ghani Hamid
 Abdul Halim Haron
 Abdul Hamid Jumat
 Abdul Hamid Khan (badminton)
 Abdul Kahar Othman
 Abdul Malik Abdul Bashir
 Abdul Nizam Abdul Hamid
 Abdul Rahim Ishak
 Abdul Rahim Shapiee
 Abdul Samad Ismail
 Abdullah Tarmugi
 Abhiraj Singh
 Abigail Sin
 Abisara geza
 Abisara kausambi
 Abisara saturata
 Abisara savitri
 Abneet Bharti (footballer)
 Abolition of Forced Labour Convention
 Abortion in Singapore
 Abraham Logan
 Absolutely Charming
 Abu Bakar bin Taha
 Abu Bakar of Johor
 Abu Hassan Penchuri
 Academic grading in Singapore
 Acanthosaura armata
 Acar
 Accelerator (Universal Studios Singapore)
 Accounting and Corporate Regulatory Authority
 Achar!
 Acraea terpsicore
 Acrocercops tetradeta
 Acrochordus granulatus
 Acronis
 Acropyga acutiventris
 Acytolepis puspa
 Acıbadem Healthcare Group
 Adam Chen
 Adam Hakeem
 Adam Kamis
 Adam Khoo
 Adam Mitter
 Adam Park Guild House
 Adam Reefdy
 Adam Smith (coach)
 Adam Swandi
 Addicted to Love (TV series)
 Additional CPF Housing Grant
 Addy Lee
 Addy Rasidi
 Adekunle Adeyeye
 Adele Tan
 Adele Wong
 Adelene Wee
 Adeline Foo
 Ademco Security Group
 Adinandra integerrima
 Adlane Messelem
 Administration of Muslim Law Act
 Administrative divisions of Singapore
 Administrative law in Singapore
 Admiralty FC
 Admiralty MRT station
 Admiralty Park
 Admiralty Rangers FC
 Admiralty, Singapore
 Adnan Saidi
 Adrian Butters
 Adrian Pang
 Adrian Tan
 Adrian Zaugg
 Adrian Zecha
 Adriano Bernardini
 Advanced Combat Man System
 Advanced Integrated Manufacturing
 Advent of...
 Aetos Security Management
 Afghanistan at the 2010 Summer Youth Olympics
 Afiq Noor
 Afiq Yunos
 After Hours (Singaporean TV series)
 After School (2003 film)
 Afuri
 Against the Light
 Against the Tide (TV series)
 Age of Glory 2
 Agency for Science, Technology and Research
 Agnes Fong Sock Har
 Agnes Joaquim
 Agoda
 Agorius constrictus
 Agreement between New Zealand and Singapore on a Closer Economic Partnership
 Agreement establishing the Asian Development Bank
 Agreement establishing the Common Fund for Commodities
 Agreement on Agriculture
 Agreement on Government Procurement
 Agreement on Technical Barriers to Trade
 Agreement on Trade-Related Investment Measures
 Agreement on the Application of Sanitary and Phytosanitary Measures
 Agreement on the Importation of Educational, Scientific and Cultural Materials
 Agreement relating to the International Telecommunications Satellite Organization
 Agri-Food and Veterinary Authority of Singapore
 Agriculture in Singapore
 Agu Casmir
 Agustine Limanto
 Ah Beng
 Ah Boys to Men
 Ah Boys to Men (film series)
 Ah Boys to Men 2
 Ah Boys to Men 3: Frogmen
 Ah Boys to Men 4
 Ah Girls Go Army
 Ah Kong
 Ah Long Pte Ltd
 Ah Meng
 Ahaetulla mycterizans
 Ahaetulla prasina
 Ahli Fiqir
 Ahmad Ibrahim (Singaporean politician)
 Ahmad Ibrahim Primary School
 Ahmad Ibrahim Secondary School
 Ahmad Latiff Khamaruddin
 Ahmad Mattar
 Ahmad Mohamed Ibrahim
 Ahmad Mohamed Magad
 Ahmad Nizam Abbas
 Ahmad Paijan
 Ahmad Syahir
 Ahmad Wartam
 Ahmadiyya in Singapore
 Ahmadulhaq Che Omar
 Ahmed Fahmie
 Ai Tong School
 Aide Iskandar
 Aidha
 Aidil Johari
 Aidil Sharin Sahak
 Aileen Tan
 Aiman Zavyan
 Ainan Celeste Cawley
 Air China Flight 112
 Aircraft Protocol to the Cape Town Treaty
 Airforce (TV series)
 Airport Logistics Park
 Airport Police Division
 Ais kacang
 Aisyah Aziz
 Ajit Singh Gill
 Ajoomma
 Akbar Nawas
 Akbar Shah (footballer)
 Akihiro Nakamura
 Akiya Wada
 Akmal bin Azman
 Akshay Puri
 Akulaku
 Al Vergara
 Al-Muhtadee Billah
 Al-Qaasimy Rahman
 Alaipayuthey (TV series)
 Alan Chan
 Alan Collins (diplomat)
 Alan Hunt (diplomat)
 Alan Murray (golfer)
 Alan Shadrake
 Alan Tern
 Alan Vest
 Alan Watt (diplomat)
 Alando Atkinson
 Alaric Tay
 Albania at the 2010 Summer Youth Olympics
 Albert Chua
 Albert Winsemius
 Alberto Tricarico
 Albirex Niigata Singapore FC
 Alec Wills
 Aleksandar Đurić
 Alen Kozar
 Alex Au
 Alex Josey
 Alex Tan
 Alex Wan
 Alex Weaver
 Alex Yam
 Alexander Argüelles
 Alexander Swettenham
 Alexander Sym Small
 Alexandra Canal, Singapore
 Alexandra Constituency
 Alexandra Halt railway station
 Alexandra Hill, Singapore
 Alexandra Hospital
 Alexandra North
 Alexandra, Singapore
 Alexis Lee
 Alfian Sa'at
 Alfred Emuejeraye
 Alfred Parsons (diplomat)
 Alfred Sim
 Algeria at the 2010 Summer Youth Olympics
 Ali Baba Bujang Lapok
 Ali Bakar
 Ali Hudzafi
 Ali Sadikin
 Ali Zahid
 Alice Pennefather
 Alice Tay
 Alif Iskandar
 Aliff Aziz
 Aliff Shafaein
 Alila Hotels and Resorts
 Alina Chan
 Aline Wong
 Alireza Mansourian
 Alistair Edwards
 Aljunied
 Aljunied Constituency
 Aljunied Group Representation Constituency
 Aljunied MRT station
 Alkaff Bridge
 Alkaff Gardens
 Alkaff Mansion
 All I Want Is...
 All the Essentially Essential
 All-Malaya Council of Joint Action
 Allan Massie
 Allan Ng
 Allan Wu
 Allen & Gledhill
 Alli Austria
 Allotinus unicolor
 Alocasia longiloba
 Aloysius Cheang
 Aloysius Pang
 Aloysius Yap
 Aloysius Yapp
 Alpine Eternity
 Already Famous
 Alsagoff family
 Alstom Metropolis C751A
 Alstom Metropolis C751C
 Alstom Metropolis C830
 Alstom Metropolis C830C
 Alstom Metropolis C851E
 Alstom Movia R151
 Altez
 Alvin Pang
 Alvin Poh
 Alvin Tan (director)
 Alvin Tan (politician)
 Alvin Yeo
 Alvogen
 Alysia Yeoh
 Aman Desai
 Aman Resorts
 Amanda Drury
 Amanda Heng
 Amanda Lee Koe
 Amanda Lim
 Amanda Ng
 Amardeep Singh
 Amathusia phidippus
 Amazon.sg
 Amber Mansions
 Ambroise Begue
 Amdon
 Amer Hakeem
 American President Lines
 American Samoa at the 2010 Summer Youth Olympics
 American-British-Dutch-Australian Command
 Amin Nasir
 Amir Eftekhari
 Amir Syafiz
 Amir Zalani
 Amira Arnon
 Amirul Adli
 Amirul Haikal
 Amiruldin Asraf
 Amita Berthier
 Amitabha Buddhist Centre
 Amjad Mahboob
 Ammirul Emmran
 Amos Boon
 Amos Yee
 Amoy Street, Singapore
 Ampittia dioscorides
 Amrin Amin
 Amy Cheng
 Amy Ede
 Amy Khor
 Amy Recha
 An Enchanted Life
 An Extremely Goofy Movie
 An Hyo-yeon
 An Ode to Life
 Anak-ku Sazali
 Anamah Tan
 Anantha Krishna
 Anaqi Ismit
 Anarchism in Singapore
 Anastasia Tjendri-Liew
 Anaz Abdul Hadee
 Ancema blanka
 Anchorvale
 Ancistroides folus
 Ancistroides nigrita
 Anders Aplin
 Anderson Bridge (Singapore)
 Anderson Junior College
 Anderson Secondary School
 Anderson Serangoon Junior College
 Andie Chen
 Andorra at the 2010 Summer Youth Olympics
 Andrea Damiani
 Andrea De Cruz
 Andrea Kieffer
 Andreas Jungdal
 Andreas Michaelis
 Andrei Ciolacu
 Andrew Ang
 Andrew Aw
 Andrew Caldecott
 Andrew Clarke (British Army officer, born 1824)
 Andrew Durante
 Andrew Kuan
 Andrew Loke
 Andrew Phang
 Andrew Road triple murders
 Andrew Seow
 Andrew Tang (racing driver)
 Andrew Wee
 Andrew Witty
 Andrey Rozhkov
 Andrey Tatarinov
 Andrey Varankow
 Andruew Tang
 André Martins (footballer, born 1989)
 Andy Ahmad
 Andy Kwek
 Andy Ong
 Andy Pengelly
 Ang Bang Heng
 Ang Chee Sia Ong Temple
 Ang Chen Xiang
 Ang Cheng Hock
 Ang Hin Kee
 Ang Mo Kio
 Ang Mo Kio - Thye Hua Kwan Hospital
 Ang Mo Kio Bus Interchange
 Ang Mo Kio Group Representation Constituency
 Ang Mo Kio MRT station
 Ang Mo Kio New Town
 Ang Mo Kio Police Division
 Ang Mo Kio Public Library
 Ang Mo Kio Secondary School
 Ang Mo Kio Single Member Constituency
 Ang Mo Kio Town Garden East
 Ang Mo Kio Town Garden West
 Ang Mong Seng
 Ang Peng Siong
 Ang Soon Tong
 Ang Swee Chai
 Ang Wei Neng
 Ang Yong Guan
 Ang Zhiwei
 Ang mo
 Angel's Dream
 Angela Lee
 Angeline Chua
 Angelito: Ang Bagong Yugto
 Angiopteris evecta
 Anglican Diocese of Singapore
 Anglican Diocese of Singapore (1909)
 Anglican High School, Singapore
 Anglo Singapore International School
 Anglo-Chinese Junior College
 Anglo-Chinese School
 Anglo-Chinese School (Barker Road)
 Anglo-Chinese School (Independent)
 Anglo-Chinese School (International) Singapore
 Anglo-Dutch Treaty of 1824
 Anglo-Thai Peace Treaty
 Angola at the 2010 Summer Youth Olympics
 Ani Yudhoyono
 Anima: Age of the Robots
 Animal Concerns Research and Education Society
 Animation Nation
 Anime Festival Asia
 Aniplus
 Aniq Raushan
 Anish Paraam
 Anita Kapoor
 Anita Moorjani
 Anita Nergaard
 Anita Sarawak
 Anja Chong
 Anjana Vasan
 Ann Elizabeth Wee
 Ann Kok
 Ann Siang Hill
 Anna Belle Francis
 Anna Cummer
 Annabel Chong
 Annalakshmi
 Annamalai (2014 TV series)
 Annandale's rat
 Anne E. Derse
 Anne Genetet
 Anne Griffith-Jones
 Annette Lee
 Anousone Prasitharath
 Anson Constituency
 Anson, Singapore
 Antara Dua Darjat
 Ante Barać
 Anthea Ong
 Anthene emolus
 Anthene lycaenina
 Anthony Adur
 Anthony Aymard
 Anthony Chen
 Anthony Fok
 Anthony Ler
 Anthony Moulin
 Anthony Poon
 Anthony Thng
 Anthony Yeo
 Anti Video Piracy Association of Singapore
 Antigua and Barbuda at the 2010 Summer Youth Olympics
 Antlabs
 Antler (venture capital firm)
 Antoine Viterale
 Antonia Kidman
 Antonin Trilles
 Antonio H. Castro Neto
 Antony Phillipson
 Antti Kuosmanen
 Antônio Braga Neto
 Anucha Chuaysri
 Anugerah Planet Muzik
 Anumanthan Kumar
 Anurak Srikerd
 Anwar Hadi
 Anwell Technologies
 Apam balik
 Aphasia (Tanya Chua album)
 Apostille Convention
 Apostolic Nunciature to Singapore
 Appias indra
 Appias libythea
 Appias olferna
 Apple Chan
 Apple Hong
 Apprentice (film)
 April 1949 Singapore Municipal Commission election
 Aqhari Abdullah
 Aqil Yazid
 Aqilah Andin
 Aquatics at the 1993 Southeast Asian Games
 Arab Singaporeans
 Arab Street
 Arata Izumi
 Arcadia Road
 Archaeology in Singapore
 Archer-class submarine
 Archery Association of Singapore
 Archery at the 1983 Southeast Asian Games
 Archery at the 1993 Southeast Asian Games
 Archery at the 2010 Summer Youth Olympics
 Archery at the 2010 Summer Youth Olympics – Boys' individual
 Archery at the 2010 Summer Youth Olympics – Girls' individual
 Archery at the 2010 Summer Youth Olympics – Mixed team
 Archery at the 2015 ASEAN Para Games
 Archery at the 2015 Southeast Asian Games
 Archibald Paris
 Archie Campbell (judge)
 Archipelago Brewery
 Architecture of Dakota Crescent
 Architecture of Singapore
 Ardmore Residence
 Are You My Brother?
 Area Licensing Scheme
 Argentina at the 2010 Summer Youth Olympics
 Arhopala abseus
 Arhopala ammon
 Arhopala centaurus
 Arhopala eumolphus
 Arion Women's Football Club
 Aristotle (horse)
 Aritra Dutta
 Arjun Mutreja
 Arjuna Mahendran
 Armanizam Dolah
 Armbrust
 Armenia at the 2010 Summer Youth Olympics
 Armenian Church, Singapore
 Armenian Street Char Kway Teow
 Armenian Street, Singapore
 Armenians in Singapore
 Armenia–Singapore relations
 Armin Bošnjak
 Armin Maier
 Armour (Singapore Army)
 Arms Offences Act
 Army Daze
 Army Deployment Force
 Army Intelligence (Singapore)
 Arnold Gay
 Arnoud De Meyer
 Around the World in 80 Gardens
 Arshad Shamim
 Art Apart Fair
 Art Elective Programme (Singapore)
 Art Fazil
 Art Plural Gallery
 Art Stage Singapore
 ArtScience Museum
 Arthur Edward Barstow
 Arthur Edward Cumming
 Arthur Fong
 Arthur Percival
 Arthur Yap
 Arthur Young (colonial administrator)
 Arthur de la Mare
 Article 12 of the Constitution of Singapore
 Article 13 of the Constitution of Singapore
 Article 14 of the Constitution of Singapore
 Article 15 of the Constitution of Singapore
 Article 9 of the Constitution of Singapore
 Articles of Agreement of the Asian Infrastructure Investment Bank
 Articles of Agreement of the International Bank for Reconstruction and Development
 Articles of Agreement of the International Development Association
 Articles of Agreement of the International Finance Corporation
 Articles of Agreement of the International Monetary Fund
 Artur Ekert
 Artūras Rimkevičius
 Aruba at the 2010 Summer Youth Olympics
 Arumugam Ponnu Rajah
 Arumugam Vijiaratnam
 Arun Shenoy
 Arun Shenoy discography
 Arundina
 Arya Samaj in Singapore
 Aryaman Sunil
 As You Like It (TV series)
 As the Bell Rings (Singaporean TV series)
 Asahi Yokokawa
 Asam pedas
 Asas '50
 Asda Jayanama
 Ashley Isham
 Ashot Nadanian
 Ashraf Safdar
 Ashrin Shariff
 Ashrul Syafeeq
 Ashton Chen Yong Zhao
 Asia Airfreight Terminal
 Asia Bagus
 Asia Business News
 Asia Business Report
 Asia Capital Reinsurance
 Asia Fashion Exchange
 Asia Inc.
 Asia Insurance Building
 Asia Market Week
 Asia Market Wrap
 Asia News Network
 Asia Pacific Dragons
 Asia Pacific Resources International Holdings
 Asia Square
 Asia Squawk Box
 Asia's Got Talent
 Asia's Got Talent (season 1)
 Asia's Got Talent (season 2)
 Asia's Next Top Model
 Asia's Next Top Model (season 1)
 Asia's Next Top Model (season 3)
 Asia's Next Top Model (season 4)
 Asia's Next Top Model (season 5)
 Asia-Pacific Economic Cooperation
 AsiaOne
 Asiaciti Trust
 Asian Aerospace
 Asian Australasian Society of Neurological Surgeons
 Asian Children's Festival
 Asian Civilisations Museum
 Asian Festival of First Films
 Asian Film Archive
 Asian Food Network
 Asian Geographic
 Asian Home Gourmet
 Asian Institute of Digital Finance
 Asian Journal of Public Affairs
 Asian Media Information and Communication Centre
 Asian Pastry Cup
 Asian Rugby League Federation
 Asian Scientist
 Asian Society of International Law
 Asian Sponsorship Association
 Asian Television Awards
 Asian Tour
 Asian small-clawed otter
 Asian-Pacific Postal Union
 Asiapac Books
 Asiatravel.com
 Asia–Europe Foundation
 Asmah Laili
 Asraf Rashid
 Asshukrie Wahid
 Assisi Hospice
 Association of Women for Action and Research
 Assumption English School
 Astbury Marsden
 Asterisk (esports)
 Astra Sharma
 Astreal
 Astrid S. Tuminez
 Astro Sensasi
 Astroscale
 Asymptote (magazine)
 Atbara House
 Athens bid for the 2010 Summer Youth Olympics
 Athiyaayam
 Athletes from Kuwait at the 2010 Summer Youth Olympics
 Athletics at the 1973 Southeast Asian Peninsular Games
 Athletics at the 1983 Southeast Asian Games
 Athletics at the 2009 Asian Youth Games
 Athletics at the 2010 Summer Youth Olympics
 Athletics at the 2010 Summer Youth Olympics – Boys' 10 kilometre walk
 Athletics at the 2010 Summer Youth Olympics – Boys' 100 metres
 Athletics at the 2010 Summer Youth Olympics – Boys' 1000 metres
 Athletics at the 2010 Summer Youth Olympics – Boys' 110 metre hurdles
 Athletics at the 2010 Summer Youth Olympics – Boys' 200 metres
 Athletics at the 2010 Summer Youth Olympics – Boys' 2000 metre steeplechase
 Athletics at the 2010 Summer Youth Olympics – Boys' 3000 metres
 Athletics at the 2010 Summer Youth Olympics – Boys' 400 metre hurdles
 Athletics at the 2010 Summer Youth Olympics – Boys' 400 metres
 Athletics at the 2010 Summer Youth Olympics – Boys' discus throw
 Athletics at the 2010 Summer Youth Olympics – Boys' hammer throw
 Athletics at the 2010 Summer Youth Olympics – Boys' high jump
 Athletics at the 2010 Summer Youth Olympics – Boys' javelin throw
 Athletics at the 2010 Summer Youth Olympics – Boys' long jump
 Athletics at the 2010 Summer Youth Olympics – Boys' medley relay
 Athletics at the 2010 Summer Youth Olympics – Boys' pole vault
 Athletics at the 2010 Summer Youth Olympics – Boys' shot put
 Athletics at the 2010 Summer Youth Olympics – Boys' triple jump
 Athletics at the 2010 Summer Youth Olympics – Girls' 100 metre hurdles
 Athletics at the 2010 Summer Youth Olympics – Girls' 100 metres
 Athletics at the 2010 Summer Youth Olympics – Girls' 1000 metres
 Athletics at the 2010 Summer Youth Olympics – Girls' 200 metres
 Athletics at the 2010 Summer Youth Olympics – Girls' 2000 metre steeplechase
 Athletics at the 2010 Summer Youth Olympics – Girls' 3000 metres
 Athletics at the 2010 Summer Youth Olympics – Girls' 400 metre hurdles
 Athletics at the 2010 Summer Youth Olympics – Girls' 400 metres
 Athletics at the 2010 Summer Youth Olympics – Girls' 5 kilometre walk
 Athletics at the 2010 Summer Youth Olympics – Girls' discus throw
 Athletics at the 2010 Summer Youth Olympics – Girls' hammer throw
 Athletics at the 2010 Summer Youth Olympics – Girls' high jump
 Athletics at the 2010 Summer Youth Olympics – Girls' javelin throw
 Athletics at the 2010 Summer Youth Olympics – Girls' long jump
 Athletics at the 2010 Summer Youth Olympics – Girls' medley relay
 Athletics at the 2010 Summer Youth Olympics – Girls' pole vault
 Athletics at the 2010 Summer Youth Olympics – Girls' shot put
 Athletics at the 2010 Summer Youth Olympics – Girls' triple jump
 Athletics at the 2015 ASEAN Para Games
 Athletics at the 2015 Southeast Asian Games
 Athletics at the 2015 Southeast Asian Games – Men's 10,000 metres
 Athletics at the 2015 Southeast Asian Games – Men's 100 metres
 Athletics at the 2015 Southeast Asian Games – Men's 1500 metres
 Athletics at the 2015 Southeast Asian Games – Men's 20 kilometres walk
 Athletics at the 2015 Southeast Asian Games – Men's 200 metres
 Athletics at the 2015 Southeast Asian Games – Men's 3000 metres steeplechase
 Athletics at the 2015 Southeast Asian Games – Men's 400 metres
 Athletics at the 2015 Southeast Asian Games – Men's 5000 metres
 Athletics at the 2015 Southeast Asian Games – Men's 800 metres
 Athletics at the 2015 Southeast Asian Games – Men's hammer throw
 Athletics at the 2015 Southeast Asian Games – Men's marathon
 Athletics at the 2015 Southeast Asian Games – Women's 10,000 metres
 Athletics at the 2015 Southeast Asian Games – Women's 20 kilometres walk
 Athletics at the 2015 Southeast Asian Games – Women's 3000 metres steeplechase
 Athletics at the 2015 Southeast Asian Games – Women's 5000 metres
 Athletics at the 2015 Southeast Asian Games – Women's hammer throw
 Athletics at the 2015 Southeast Asian Games – Women's long jump
 Athletics at the 2015 Southeast Asian Games – Women's marathon
 Athyma asura
 Athyma kanwa
 Athyma nefte
 Athyma pravara
 Athyma reta
 Atm⁵
 Atsushi Kawata
 Atsushi Shimono
 Atsushi Shirota
 Attap dwelling
 Attaphol Buspakom
 Attapong Kittichamratsak
 Attorney-General of Singapore
 Au-yeong Pak Kuan
 Audi Fashion Festival Singapore
 Audrey Lim
 Audrey Yong
 August Man
 August Pictures
 Aung Kyaw Naing
 Aunty Lee's Delights
 Aureal Semiconductor
 Aurelio Vidmar
 Aurélien Hérisson
 Australia Singapore Cable
 Australia at the 2010 Summer Youth Olympics
 Australia-Asia Power Link
 Australian International School Singapore
 Australians in Singapore
 Australia–Singapore relations
 Austria at the 2010 Summer Youth Olympics
 Autism Resource Centre (Singapore)
 Autopass Card
 Autumn Dynasty
 Autumn in March
 Avatar (2004 film)
 Avation
 Aventis Graduate School
 Avi Dixit
 Aviation Park MRT station
 Aviation in Singapore
 Aw Boon Haw
 Aw Boon Par
 Aw Cheng Chye
 Aw Chu Kin
 Aw Tee Hong
 Aw family
 Awards and decorations of the Singapore Armed Forces
 Awards and decorations of the Singapore Civil Defence Force
 Awards and decorations of the Singapore Police Services
 Awards for Singapore National Serviceman
 Awfully Chocolate
 Axel Edelstam
 Axel Lewenhaupt
 Ayam Brand
 Ayam buah keluak
 Ayam masak merah
 Ayer Rajah Bus Park
 Ayer Rajah Expressway
 Ayer Rajah Single Member Constituency
 AyosDito.ph
 Ayoxxa Biosystems
 Azad Hind
 Azerai
 Azerbaijan at the 2010 Summer Youth Olympics
 Azhagiya Thamizh Magal
 Azhar Baksin
 Azhar Sairudin
 Aziz Sattar
 Aziza Ali
 Azman Abdullah
 Azmin Ali
 Azri Suhaili

B

 B1G1
 BBC Entertainment
 BOC Aviation
 BR18
 BRA (TV series)
 BW Offshore
 Baba House
 Babies On Board
 Baby Blues (Singaporean TV series)
 Baby Bonus (TV series)
 Baby Boom (Singaporean TV series)
 Baby K (artist)
 Badamia exclamationis
 Badminton at the 1973 Southeast Asian Peninsular Games
 Badminton at the 1983 Southeast Asian Games
 Badminton at the 1993 Southeast Asian Games
 Badminton at the 2010 Summer Youth Olympics
 Badminton at the 2010 Summer Youth Olympics – Boys' singles
 Badminton at the 2010 Summer Youth Olympics – Girls' singles
 Badminton at the 2015 ASEAN Para Games
 Badminton at the 2015 Southeast Asian Games
 Badminton at the 2015 Southeast Asian Games – Men's doubles
 Badminton at the 2015 Southeast Asian Games – Men's singles
 Badminton at the 2015 Southeast Asian Games – Men's team
 Badminton at the 2015 Southeast Asian Games – Mixed doubles
 Badminton at the 2015 Southeast Asian Games – Women's doubles
 Badminton at the 2015 Southeast Asian Games – Women's singles
 Badminton at the 2015 Southeast Asian Games – Women's team
 Badminton in Singapore
 Baey Yam Keng
 Baghdad Street, Singapore
 Bah Mamadou
 Bahamas at the 2010 Summer Youth Olympics
 Bahar Junction MRT station
 Bahrain at the 2009 Asian Youth Games
 Bahrain at the 2010 Summer Youth Olympics
 Bahren Shaari
 Bai Yan (actor)
 Bai wan da ying jia
 Baihakki Khaizan
 Bait 3D
 Bak kut teh
 Bakau LRT station
 Bakkwa
 Bala Reddy
 Balaji Sadasivan
 Balestier
 Balestier Art Deco shophouses
 Balestier Constituency
 Balestier Hill Secondary School
 Balestier Khalsa FC
 Balestier Point
 Balestier Road Seventh-day Adventist Church
 Balik Kampung
 Ballamodou Conde
 Ballantine's Championship
 Ballast Water Management Convention
 Baller Magazine
 Balli Kaur Jaswal
 Bambang Sutrisno
 Ban Zu
 Banana fritter
 BandLab Technologies
 Banded bullfrog
 Banded flying snake
 Banded krait
 Bandung (drink)
 Bangkit LRT station
 Bangla Language and Literary Society, Singapore
 Bangladesh at the 2009 Asian Youth Games
 Bangladesh at the 2010 Summer Youth Olympics
 Bangladesh–Singapore relations
 Banjar people
 Bank of China Building (Singapore)
 Bank of Singapore
 Banking in Singapore
 Banmian
 Banyan Tree Holdings
 Baoris farri
 Barangay 143
 Barbados at the 2010 Summer Youth Olympics
 Barbara Yu Ling
 Barings Bank
 Barisan Sosialis
 Barker Road Methodist Church
 Barry Desker
 Barry Maguire (footballer, born 1989)
 Barry Whitbread
 Bartley MRT station
 Bartley Road
 Bartley Secondary School
 Basic Military Training Centre
 Basil Roberts
 Basile Essa Mvondo
 Basketball Association of Singapore
 Basketball at the 1983 Southeast Asian Games
 Basketball at the 2007 Southeast Asian Games
 Basketball at the 2010 Summer Youth Olympics
 Basketball at the 2010 Summer Youth Olympics – Boys' tournament
 Basketball at the 2010 Summer Youth Olympics – Girls' tournament
 Basketball at the 2011 Southeast Asian Games
 Basketball at the 2013 Southeast Asian Games – Men's tournament
 Basketball at the 2015 Southeast Asian Games
 Basketball at the 2015 Southeast Asian Games – Men's tournament
 Basketball at the 2015 Southeast Asian Games – Women's tournament
 Baskin-Robbins
 Bassarona teuta
 Battle of Bukit Timah
 Battle of Kota Bharu
 Battle of Kranji
 Battle of Pasir Panjang
 Battle of Sarimbun Beach
 Battleships Forever
 Battlestar Galactica (roller coaster)
 Baybeats
 Bayfront MRT station
 Bayshore MRT station
 Be Happy (TV series)
 Be My Lady
 Be with Me
 Beach Road, Singapore
 Beach volleyball at the 2009 Asian Youth Games
 Beach.Ball.Babes
 Beardless barb
 Beatrice Chia
 Beatty Secondary School
 Beautiful Connection
 Beautiful Illusions
 Beautiful Seed
 Beautiful Trio
 Beauty World (musical)
 Beauty World MRT station
 Beauty World Market
 Beca Group
 Bedok
 Bedok Bus Interchange
 Bedok Constituency
 Bedok Green Secondary School
 Bedok Group Representation Constituency
 Bedok Lighthouse
 Bedok MRT station
 Bedok Mall
 Bedok North Bus Depot
 Bedok North MRT station
 Bedok Point
 Bedok Police Division
 Bedok Public Library
 Bedok Reservoir
 Bedok Reservoir MRT station
 Bedok South MRT station
 Bedok South Secondary School
 Bedok Stadium
 Bedok View Secondary School
 Bedok-class mine countermeasures vessel
 Bee Cheng Hiang
 Beef kway teow
 Beer in Singapore
 Before We Forget
 Beier Ko
 Beijing Guoan Talent Singapore FC
 Being Human (2010 film)
 Beiwen Zhang
 Belarus at the 2010 Summer Youth Olympics
 Belgium at the 2010 Summer Youth Olympics
 Belinda Ang
 Belinda Hamnett
 Belinda Lee Xin Yu
 Belize at the 2010 Summer Youth Olympics
 Ben & Jerry's
 Ben Davis (footballer, born 2000)
 Ben Dixon (English footballer)
 Ben Yeo
 Bencoolen MRT station
 Bencoolen Street
 Bendemeer House
 Bendemeer MRT station
 Bendemeer, Singapore
 Benedict Tan
 Beng Chin Ooi
 Bengawan Solo (company)
 Benin at the 2010 Summer Youth Olympics
 Benjamin Batson
 Benjamin Bertrand
 Benjamin Heng
 Benjamin Kheng
 Benjamin Khoh
 Benjamin Lee (footballer)
 Benjamin Pwee
 Benjamin Sheares
 Benjamin Sheares Bridge
 Benjamin Tee
 Benjamin Yeoh
 Benny Lim
 Benny Ong
 Benoi Sector
 Benoît Croissant
 Benoît Salviat
 Berita Harian (Singapore)
 Bermuda at the 2010 Summer Youth Olympics
 Bernadette Ong
 Bernam Street
 Bernard Chan (swimmer)
 Bernard Cheong
 Bernard Rodrigues
 Bernard Tan
 Bernard Yeung
 Bernd Stange
 Berne Convention
 Berry Bees (TV series)
 Bertalan Bicskei
 Bertil Andersson
 Bertram Charles Butler
 Best Denki
 Bethany Independent-Presbyterian Church Singapore
 Better Than Ever
 Bevlyn Khoo
 Bey Soo Khiang
 Beyond (Singaporean TV series)
 Beyond Words (TV series)
 Beyond the Axis of Truth
 Beyond the aXis of Truth II
 Bhumiband
 Bhutan at the 2010 Summer Youth Olympics
 Bi Jinhao
 Bibasis harisa
 Bibasis sena
 Bible Society of Singapore, Malaysia and Brunei
 Bible-Presbyterian churches (Singapore)
 Biblical Graduate School of Theology
 Bibliography of Singapore
 Bidadari Cemetery
 Bidadari Garden
 Bidadari Park
 Bidadari, Singapore
 Bidasari (film)
 Bids for the 2010 Summer Youth Olympics
 Bids for the 2012 Summer Olympics
 Big Splash, Singapore
 Bihun goreng
 Bilahari Kausikan
 Bill Hay (field hockey)
 Bill Mamadou
 Bill Pritchett
 Billiards and snooker at the 2015 Southeast Asian Games
 Billy Goh
 Billy Key
 Billy King (sportsman)
 Billy Mehmet
 Bima (dredge)
 Bindahara phocides
 Bindo
 Bintang Bakti Masyarakat
 Bintang Temasek
 Bio-Treat Technology
 Bioinformatics Institute (Singapore)
 Biological Weapons Convention
 Biomedical Research Council
 Bionix AFV
 Biopolis
 Biosensors International
 Bird Paradise
 Birthday of the Monkey God
 Biryani
 Bishan Bus Interchange
 Bishan Depot
 Bishan East
 Bishan MRT station
 Bishan New Town
 Bishan Public Library
 Bishan Sports Hall
 Bishan Stadium
 Bishan otter family
 Bishan tunnel flooding
 Bishan, Singapore
 Bishan-Ang Mo Kio Park
 Bishan–Toa Payoh Group Representation Constituency
 Bishop of Kuching
 Bishop of Sabah
 Bishop of Singapore
 Bitget
 Black Rose (Singaporean TV series)
 Black and white bungalow
 Black pepper crab
 Black-bearded tomb bat
 Blade Club
 Blair McDonough
 Blangah Rise Primary School
 Blastobasis ochromorpha
 Blessings (TV series)
 Blk 88
 Blk71
 Blood Jade
 Blood Ties (2009 film)
 Blue panchax
 BlueSG
 Blyth's horseshoe bat
 Blyth's river frog
 Bo Wen Constituency
 Boat Quay
 Bob Wong (ecologist)
 Boccia at the 2015 ASEAN Para Games
 Boey Kim Cheng
 Boiga multomaculata
 Bojan Hodak
 Bolivia at the 2010 Summer Youth Olympics
 Bollywood Veggies
 Bombardier Innovia APM 100 C801
 Bombardier Innovia APM 100 C801A
 Bombardier Innovia APM 300R C801B
 Bombardier Movia C951/C951A
 Bombing of Singapore (1941)
 Bombing of Singapore (1944–1945)
 Bonnie Loo
 Bonny Hicks
 Boo Junfeng
 Book and Sword, Gratitude and Revenge
 BooksActually
 Boomerang (Asian TV channel)
 Boomzap Entertainment
 Boon Hui Lu
 Boon Keng
 Boon Keng MRT station
 Boon Lay
 Boon Lay Bus Interchange
 Boon Lay MRT station
 Boon Lay Planning Area
 Boon Lay Secondary School
 Boon Lay Single Member Constituency
 Boon Tat Street
 Boon Teck Constituency
 Boon Thau Loo
 Borders (Asia Pacific)
 Borhan Abu Samah
 Boris Kopitović (footballer, born 1995)
 Boris Raspudić
 Borneo Wharf railway station
 Borouge
 Bosnia and Herzegovina at the 2010 Summer Youth Olympics
 Botak Jones
 Botanic Gardens MRT station
 Botswana at the 2010 Summer Youth Olympics
 Boubacar Keita
 Bountiful Blessings
 Boustead & Co.
 Boustead Singapore
 Bowen Secondary School
 Bowling at the 2009 Asian Youth Games
 Bowling at the 2015 ASEAN Para Games
 Bowling at the 2015 Southeast Asian Games
 Boxing at the 2010 Summer Youth Olympics
 Boxing at the 2010 Summer Youth Olympics – Men's +91 kg
 Boxing at the 2010 Summer Youth Olympics – Men's 48 kg
 Boxing at the 2010 Summer Youth Olympics – Men's 51 kg
 Boxing at the 2010 Summer Youth Olympics – Men's 54 kg
 Boxing at the 2010 Summer Youth Olympics – Men's 57 kg
 Boxing at the 2010 Summer Youth Olympics – Men's 60 kg
 Boxing at the 2010 Summer Youth Olympics – Men's 64 kg
 Boxing at the 2010 Summer Youth Olympics – Men's 69 kg
 Boxing at the 2010 Summer Youth Olympics – Men's 75 kg
 Boxing at the 2010 Summer Youth Olympics – Men's 81 kg
 Boxing at the 2010 Summer Youth Olympics – Men's 91 kg
 Boxing at the 2015 Southeast Asian Games
 Boy (2009 film)
 Boyko Kamenov
 Boys' Brigade in Singapore
 Brackenridgea hookeri
 Brad Davidson
 Brad Lau
 Braddell Bus Park
 Braddell Heights Single Member Constituency
 Braddell Heights Symphony Orchestra
 Braddell MRT station
 Braddell Secondary School
 Braddell-Westlake Secondary School
 Bradley Groves
 Branch MRT line
 Brandon Wade
 Brandon Wong (actor)
 Brani Naval Base
 Brani Regional Base
 Branko Hucika
 Branko Čubrilo
 Branyo
 Bras Basah
 Bras Basah Constituency
 Bras Basah MRT station
 Bras Basah Road
 Brazil at the 2010 Summer Youth Olympics
 Bread Street Kitchen, Singapore
 BreadTalk
 Break Free (TV series)
 Breakfast Network
 Breakout (Singaporean TV series)
 Brendon Santalab
 Brian Bothwell
 Brian McLean
 Brickland MRT station
 Brickworks Constituency
 Brickworks Group Representation Constituency
 Brickworks, Singapore
 Bridget Tan
 Brigadier general
 Bright Hill MRT station
 Bright Vision Hospital
 Brilliant rasbora
 Bring Back the Dead
 British Association for Cemeteries in South Asia
 British Defence Singapore Support Unit
 British Far East Command
 British Malaya
 British Military Administration (Malaya)
 British Military Hospital, Singapore
 British Theatre Playhouse
 British Virgin Islands at the 2010 Summer Youth Olympics
 Broadrick Secondary School
 Bromheadia finlaysoniana
 Bronchocela cristatella
 Bronco All Terrain Tracked Carrier
 Brotherhood (2002 TV series)
 Brotzeit (restaurant)
 Browhaus
 Bruce Yardley
 Brunei and Malaysia
 Brunei at the 2010 Summer Youth Olympics
 Brunei at the 2015 Southeast Asian Games
 Brunei–Singapore relations
 Bruno Reversade
 Bruno Suzuki
 Brussels Collision Convention
 Brussels Convention on Assistance and Salvage at Sea
 Bryan Soane
 Bryan Tay
 Bryan Wong
 Bu Xin
 Buangkok
 Buangkok MRT station
 Bubbly (social network)
 Bubur cha cha
 Budapest Treaty
 Buddha Tooth Relic Temple and Museum
 Buddha of Medicine Welfare Society
 Buddhika Mendis
 Buddhism in Singapore
 Buddhist Library (Singapore)
 Buddhist Research Society
 Budget Aviation Holdings
 Buenaventura Villamayor
 Buffalo Boys (2018 film)
 Bugis
 Bugis Junction
 Bugis MRT station
 Bugis Street (film)
 Bugis+
 Bugis, Singapore
 Build to order (HDB)
 Building and Construction Authority
 Bujang Lapok
 Bukit Batok
 Bukit Batok Bus Depot
 Bukit Batok Bus Interchange
 Bukit Batok Central
 Bukit Batok MRT station
 Bukit Batok Memorial
 Bukit Batok Nature Park
 Bukit Batok Public Library
 Bukit Batok Secondary School
 Bukit Batok Single Member Constituency
 Bukit Batok Town Park
 Bukit Batok West MRT station
 Bukit Brown MRT station
 Bukit Canberra
 Bukit Chandu
 Bukit Gombak
 Bukit Gombak MRT station
 Bukit Gombak Single Member Constituency
 Bukit Gombak Stadium
 Bukit Ho Swee
 Bukit Ho Swee (TV series)
 Bukit Ho Swee Constituency
 Bukit Ho Swee fire
 Bukit Merah
 Bukit Merah (subzone)
 Bukit Merah Bus Interchange
 Bukit Merah Secondary School
 Bukit Merah Single Member Constituency
 Bukit Panjang
 Bukit Panjang Bus Interchange
 Bukit Panjang Government High School
 Bukit Panjang LRT line
 Bukit Panjang MRT/LRT station
 Bukit Panjang Public Library
 Bukit Panjang Single Member Constituency
 Bukit Panjang railway station
 Bukit Pasoh Road
 Bukit Purmei
 Bukit Timah
 Bukit Timah Expressway
 Bukit Timah Group Representation Constituency
 Bukit Timah Hill
 Bukit Timah Monkey Man
 Bukit Timah Nature Reserve
 Bukit Timah Race Course
 Bukit Timah Road
 Bukit Timah Satellite Earth Station
 Bukit Timah Single Member Constituency
 Bukit Timah Truss Bridge
 Bukit Timah railway station
 Bukit View Secondary School
 Bulgaria at the 2010 Summer Youth Olympics
 Bulim Bus Depot
 Bumitama Agri
 Buona Vista
 Buona Vista Battery
 Buona Vista MRT station
 Buona Vista Single Member Constituency
 Burdett Coutts
 Bureau of East Asian and Pacific Affairs
 Burkill Hall
 Burkina Faso at the 2010 Summer Youth Olympics
 Burmese Buddhist Temple (Singapore)
 Burundi at the 2010 Summer Youth Olympics
 Bus Services Industry Act
 Bus contracting model of Singapore
 Business Angel Network of Southeast Asia
 Business Center (TV program)
 Bust of a Chinese Gentleman
 Butterfly House, Singapore
 By My Side (TV series)
 By-elections in Singapore
 By2
 By2 discography

C

 C. Boden Kloss
 C. Kunalan
 C. V. Subramanian
 C.I.D. (Singaporean TV series)
 C.L.I.F.
 C.L.I.F. 2
 C.L.I.F. 3
 C.L.I.F. 4
 C.L.I.F. 5
 CBN Asia
 CEPAS
 CHIJ Katong Convent
 CHIJ Saint Joseph's Convent
 CHIJ Saint Nicholas Girls' School
 CHIJ Saint Theresa's Convent
 CHIJ Secondary (Toa Payoh)
 CHIJMES
 CHIJMES Hall
 CHIMES Society
 CHK (TV channel)
 CINTRA (research laboratory)
 CITES
 CNA (TV network)
 CNA938
 CNBC Asia
 COMO Hotels and Resorts
 COO Boutique Hostel and Sociatel
 COVID-19 pandemic in Singapore
 COVID-19 vaccination in Singapore
 CPF Building
 CPG Corporation
 CTRL (TV series)
 Cabinet of Singapore
 Cadet inspector
 Cadi Scientific
 Cages (film)
 Cai Mingjie
 Cai Xiaoli
 Cairnhill FC
 Cairnhill Single Member Constituency
 Calamaria albiventer
 Caldecott Hill
 Caldecott MRT station
 Caldwell House, Singapore
 Caledonian Hotel, Singapore
 Calefare
 Caleta elna
 Calliophis bivirgatus
 Caltoris cormasa
 Caltoris philippina
 Calvin Cheng
 Calvin Kang Li Loong
 Cambodia at the 2010 Summer Youth Olympics
 Cambodia at the 2015 Southeast Asian Games
 Cambodia–Singapore relations
 Cambridge Institute (Singapore)
 Cambridge SoundWorks
 Camden Medical Centre
 Camera (2014 film)
 Cameron Edwards
 Cameroon at the 2010 Summer Youth Olympics
 Campbell Wilson
 Campnosperma squamatum
 Campus SuperStar
 Campus SuperStar (season 1)
 Campus SuperStar (season 2)
 Campus SuperStar (season 3)
 Campus SuperStar (season 4)
 Canada at the 2010 Summer Youth Olympics
 Canada–Singapore relations
 Canadian International School (Singapore)
 Canberra MRT station
 Canberra Plaza, Singapore
 Canberra Secondary School
 Candlenut Kitchen
 Caning in Singapore
 Cannabis in Singapore
 Canoeing at the 2010 Summer Youth Olympics
 Canoeing at the 2010 Summer Youth Olympics – Boys' C1 slalom
 Canoeing at the 2010 Summer Youth Olympics – Boys' C1 sprint
 Canoeing at the 2010 Summer Youth Olympics – Boys' K1 slalom
 Canoeing at the 2010 Summer Youth Olympics – Boys' K1 sprint
 Canoeing at the 2010 Summer Youth Olympics – Girls' K1 slalom
 Canoeing at the 2010 Summer Youth Olympics – Girls' K1 sprint
 Canoeing at the 2015 Southeast Asian Games
 Canoeing at the 2015 Southeast Asian Games – Men's C-1 1000 metres
 Canoeing at the 2015 Southeast Asian Games – Men's C-1 200 metres
 Canoeing at the 2015 Southeast Asian Games – Men's C-2 1000 metres
 Canoeing at the 2015 Southeast Asian Games – Men's C-2 200 metres
 Canoeing at the 2015 Southeast Asian Games – Men's K-1 1000 metres
 Canoeing at the 2015 Southeast Asian Games – Men's K-1 200 metres
 Canoeing at the 2015 Southeast Asian Games – Men's K-2 1000 metres
 Canoeing at the 2015 Southeast Asian Games – Men's K-2 200 metres
 Canoeing at the 2015 Southeast Asian Games – Men's K-4 1000 metres
 Canoeing at the 2015 Southeast Asian Games – Men's K-4 200 metres
 Canoeing at the 2015 Southeast Asian Games – Women's C-1 200 metres
 Canoeing at the 2015 Southeast Asian Games – Women's K-1 200 metres
 Canoeing at the 2015 Southeast Asian Games – Women's K-1 500 metres
 Canoeing at the 2015 Southeast Asian Games – Women's K-2 200 metres
 Canoeing at the 2015 Southeast Asian Games – Women's K-2 500 metres
 Canoeing at the 2015 Southeast Asian Games – Women's K-4 200 metres
 Canoeing at the 2015 Southeast Asian Games – Women's K-4 500 metres
 Canopy Flyer
 Cantonese
 Cantonment MRT station
 Cantonment Road, Singapore
 Cao Cao (album)
 CapBridge
 Cape Town Treaty
 Cape Verde at the 2010 Summer Youth Olympics
 Capella Resort, Singapore
 Capillary Technologies
 CapitaGreen
 CapitaLand
 CapitaSpring
 Capital 95.8FM
 Capital Connection (TV programme)
 Capital Express Route
 Capital Match
 Capital Tower (Singapore)
 Capital gains tax
 Capital punishment in Singapore
 Capitol Building, Singapore
 Capitol Centre, Singapore
 Capitol Singapore
 Capitol Theatre, Singapore
 Captain (armed forces)
 Carl Alexander Gibson-Hill
 Carl's Jr.
 Carlo Urbani
 Carlos Agostinho do Rosário
 Carlos Nicholas Fernandes
 Carlos Roberto Pereira
 Carmen Goh
 CarneyVale: Showtime
 Carol Smith (radio presenter)
 Carole Lin
 Caroline Cheong
 Caroline Chew (equestrian)
 Carolyn Rayna Buckle
 Carousell (company)
 Carrie Tan
 Carrie Wong
 Cartoon Network (Asian TV channel)
 Cash Is King (TV series)
 Cash-Over-Valuation
 Cashew MRT station
 Cashin House
 Casimir Cartwright van Straubenzee
 Casino Regulatory Authority of Singapore
 Cat Quest
 Cat and Mouse (album)
 Cathay Building
 Cathay Cineleisure Orchard
 Cathay Organisation
 Cathedral of the Good Shepherd
 Catherine Lim
 Catholic Bishops' Conference of Malaysia, Singapore and Brunei
 Catholic Church in Singapore
 Catholic High School, Singapore
 Catholic Junior College
 Catholic education in Singapore
 Catochrysops panormus
 Catochrysops strabo
 Catopsilia pomona
 Catopsilia pyranthe
 Catopsilia scylla
 Catrien Eijken
 Causeway Point
 Cave nectar bat
 Cavenagh Bridge
 Cavin Soh
 Cavinder Bull
 Cayman Islands at the 2010 Summer Youth Olympics
 Cebu Declaration on East Asian Energy Security
 Cecil Clementi
 Cecil Clementi Smith
 Cecilia Low
 Cedar Girls' Secondary School
 Cedric Delves
 Cedric Foo
 Celest Chong
 CellResearch Corporation
 Cendol
 Ceno2
 Censorship in Singapore
 Centennial Tower (Singapore)
 Central (TV channel)
 Central African Republic at the 2010 Summer Youth Olympics
 Central Area, Singapore
 Central Catchment Nature Reserve
 Central Executive Committee (PAP)
 Central Expressway, Singapore
 Central Fire Station, Singapore
 Central Narcotics Bureau
 Central Police Division
 Central Provident Fund
 Central Region, Singapore
 Central Sikh Temple
 Central Singapore Community Development Council
 Central Water Catchment
 Centralised institutes (Singapore)
 Centre for Advanced 2D Materials
 Centre for International Law
 Centre for Quantum Technologies
 Centrepoint Kids
 Century Square, Singapore
 Cerebos Pacific
 Certificate of Entitlement
 Certis Group
 Cethosia cyane
 Cethosia hypsea
 Chad at the 2010 Summer Youth Olympics
 Chai Chee
 Chai Hon Yam
 Chai Keong Toh
 Chai Yee Wei
 Chai tow kway
 Challenger-class submarine
 Chan Ah Kow
 Chan Chor Min Tong
 Chan Choy Siong
 Chan Chun Sing
 Chan Heng Chee
 Chan Hiang Leng Colin v Public Prosecutor
 Chan Joseph
 Chan Mali Chan
 Chan Peng Kong
 Chan Pui Yin
 Chan Sek Keong
 Chan Seng Onn
 Chan Soo Sen
 Chandra Monerawela
 Chandran Nair
 Chandrashekhar Dasgupta
 Chang & Eng
 Chang Yun Chung
 Change (Derrick Hoh album)
 Change Alley, Singapore
 Changi
 Changi (miniseries)
 Changi Air Base
 Changi Air Base (East)
 Changi Airport
 Changi Airport MRT station
 Changi Airport Skytrain
 Changi Bay
 Changi Beach Park
 Changi Boardwalk
 Changi Business Park
 Changi Chapel and Museum
 Changi City Point
 Changi Depot
 Changi East Depot
 Changi Exhibition Centre
 Changi General Hospital
 Changi Hospital
 Changi International Exhibition and Convention Centre
 Changi Murals
 Changi Naval Base
 Changi Prison
 Changi Sailing Club
 Changi Single Member Constituency
 Changi Tree
 Changi University
 Changi Village
 Changkat Constituency
 Channa gachua
 Channel 5 (Singaporean TV channel)
 Channel 8 (Singaporean TV channel)
 Channel U (Singaporean TV channel)
 Channel i (Singaporean TV channel)
 Chantal Liew
 Chantalle Ng
 Chao Hick Tin
 Chao Tzee Cheng
 Chapati
 Char kway teow
 Char siu
 Charis Global School
 Charities Act 1994
 Charles & Keith
 Charles Andrew Dyce
 Charles Chan (businessman)
 Charles Chellapah
 Charles Chong
 Charles Ferguson-Davie
 Charles Gough Howell
 Charles Gregory Pestana
 Charles John Irving
 Charles Letts
 Charles Lim
 Charles Mitchell (colonial administrator)
 Charles Powell, Baron Powell of Bayswater
 Charles T. Cross
 Charles Walter Hamilton Cochrane
 Charles Walter Sneyd-Kynnersley
 Charles Yeo
 Charlie Clough
 Charlie Goh
 Charlie Lim
 Charlie Machell
 Charlie Teo
 Charlie Twissell
 Charlotte Ferguson-Davie
 Charlotte Nicdao
 Charlton Media Group
 Charmaine Soh
 Charmaine Yee
 Charter of the Indian Ocean Rim Association for Regional Co-operation
 Charter of the United Nations
 Chartered Accountant of Singapore
 Chartered Semiconductor Manufacturing
 Chase Tan
 Chatri Sityodtong
 Chatsworth International School
 Chatterbox (restaurant)
 Chay Hong Leng
 Chay Wai Chuen
 Chay Weng Yew
 Chay Yew
 Chayut Triyachart
 Che Zahara
 Cheang Hong Lim
 Checha Davies
 Checkmate (Jung Yong-hwa and JJ Lin song)
 Chee Hong Tat
 Chee Soon Juan
 Chee Swee Lee
 Chef Wan
 Chek Jawa
 Chemical Weapons Convention
 Chemical, Biological, Radiological and Explosive Defence Group
 Chemoil
 Chen Cheng Mei
 Chen Chong Swee
 Chen Da Wei
 Chen Feng (table tennis)
 Chen Guohua
 Chen Hanwei
 Chen Jiayuan
 Chen Jin Lang
 Chen Liping
 Chen Sho Fa
 Chen Show Mao
 Chen Shucheng
 Chen Su Lan
 Chen Tianwen
 Chen Wen Hsi
 Chen Wencong
 Chen Xiuhuan
 Chen-Bo Zhu
 Cheng Beng Buddhist Society
 Cheng Ding An
 Cheng Li Hui
 Cheng Lim LRT station
 Cheng San
 Cheng San Constituency
 Cheng San Group Representation Constituency
 Cheng San Public Library
 Cheng Wai Keung
 Chenkyab Dorji
 Chennai 2 Singapore
 Cheo Chai Chen
 Cheong Choong Kong
 Cheong Chun Yin
 Cheong Eak Chong
 Cheong Koon Hean
 Cheong Soo Pieng
 Cher Ng
 Cherian George
 Cheris Lee
 Cheritra freja
 Cheryl Chan
 Cheryl Chin
 Cheryl Chou
 Cheryl Koh
 Cheryl Lu-Lien Tan
 Chesed-El Synagogue
 Chess at the 2015 ASEAN Para Games
 Chetan Suryawanshi
 Cheuk Mei Mei
 Chevron House
 Chew Chin Hin
 Chew Choon Seng
 Chew Chor Meng
 Chew Gek Khim
 Chew Jun Ru
 Chew Kheng Chuan
 Chew Men Leong
 Chew Swee Kee
 Chewing gum sales ban in Singapore
 Cheyenne Goh
 Chi Jinyu
 Chia Boon Leong
 Chia Shi-Lu
 Chia Teck Leng
 Chia Thye Poh
 Chia Yong Yong
 Chiam See Tong
 Chiang Hsiao-wu
 Chicago Convention on International Civil Aviation
 Chicken Rice War
 Chief Justice of Singapore
 Chief Minister of Singapore
 Chief Secretary, Singapore
 Chief of Defence Force (Singapore)
 Chief of Navy (Singapore)
 Chief warrant officer
 Chile at the 2010 Summer Youth Olympics
 Chilli crab
 Chimaobi Nwaogazi
 Chin Bee
 Chin Han (actor, born 1969)
 Chin Harn Tong
 Chin Liew Ten
 Chin Tet Yung
 China Aviation Oil
 China Cultural Centre (Singapore)
 China Merchants Property
 China Rich Girlfriend
 China Smith
 China Yuchai International
 China at the 2010 Summer Youth Olympics
 China-Indochina Peninsula economic corridor
 Chinatown Detective Agency
 Chinatown MRT station
 Chinatown Point
 Chinatown, Singapore
 China–Singapore relations
 Chindians
 Chinese Development Assistance Council
 Chinese Garden MRT station
 Chinese Garden, Singapore
 Chinese New Year
 Chinese Protectorate
 Chinese Singaporeans
 Chinese Taipei at the 2010 Summer Youth Olympics
 Chinese hwamei
 Chinese language
 Chinese language romanisation in Singapore
 Chinese middle schools riots
 Chinese nationals in Singapore
 Chinese privilege
 Chinese revolutionary activities in Malaya
 Chinese sausage
 Chinese wedding door games
 Chingay parade
 Chinta (film)
 Chitty
 Chiu Ban It
 Chloe Ing
 Chloe Ting
 Chng Hee Kok
 Chng Seng Mok
 Chng Seok Tin
 Chng Suan Tze v Minister for Home Affairs
 Cho Sung-hwan (footballer, born 1985)
 Choa Chong Long
 Choa Chu Kang
 Choa Chu Kang Bus Interchange
 Choa Chu Kang Cemetery
 Choa Chu Kang Columbarium
 Choa Chu Kang MRT/LRT station
 Choa Chu Kang Park
 Choa Chu Kang Public Library
 Choa Chu Kang Road
 Choa Chu Kang Stadium
 Choa Chu Kang West MRT station
 Choi Chul-woo
 Choi Dong-soo (footballer)
 Choketawee Promrut
 Chong Boon
 Chong Boon Constituency
 Chong Boon Secondary School
 Chong Chee Kin
 Chong Chi Tat
 Chong Fah Cheong
 Chong Kee Hiong
 Chong Pang
 Chong Pang Camp
 Chong Shing Yit Pao
 Choo Han Teck
 Choo Hoey
 Choo Seng Quee
 Choo Wee Khiang
 Choo Yilin
 Choor Singh
 Chope
 Chor Yeok Eng
 Chow Kwai Lam
 Choy Weng Yang
 Chris Anderson (footballer, born 1990)
 Chris Downey (footballer)
 Chris Jackson (New Zealand footballer)
 Christ Church Secondary School
 Christel Bouvron
 Christel Quek
 Christian Lee (fighter)
 Christian Sansam
 Christianity in Singapore
 Christie Chue
 Christina Ong
 Christina Stone
 Christmas
 Christmas Island
 Christopher Chen
 Christopher Dominic Ahearne
 Christopher Janik
 Christopher Lee (Malaysian actor)
 Christopher de Souza
 Christopher van Huizen
 Chronological summary of the 2010 Summer Youth Olympics
 Chrysanthemum tea
 Chrysopelea paradisi
 Chua Beng Huat
 Chua Chu Kang Group Representation Constituency
 Chua Chu Kang Secondary School
 Chua Chu Kang Single Member Constituency
 Chua Ek Kay
 Chua En Lai
 Chua Jim Neo
 Chua Koon Siong
 Chua Lam
 Chua Mia Tee
 Chua Phung Kim
 Chua Ser Koon
 Chua Ser Lien
 Chua Sian Chin
 Chua Sock Koong
 Chua Soo Bin
 Chua Wee Hian
 Chuang Chu Lin
 Chuang Yi
 Chubby Hubby
 Chun Jae-woon
 Chung Cheng High School (Main)
 Chung Cheng High School (Yishun)
 Chung Hwa Medical Institution
 Chung Khiaw Bank
 Chupe (footballer)
 Church of Divine Mercy
 Church of Our Lady Star of the Sea
 Church of Our Lady of Lourdes, Singapore
 Church of Our Lady of Perpetual Succour
 Church of Our Saviour, Singapore
 Church of Saint Francis Xavier, Singapore
 Church of Saints Peter and Paul, Singapore
 Church of St Mary of the Angels
 Church of St Teresa, Singapore
 Church of the Holy Family, Singapore
 Church of the Holy Trinity, Singapore
 Church of the Nativity of the Blessed Virgin Mary, Singapore
 Church of the Province of South East Asia
 Church of the Risen Christ
 Church of the Sacred Heart, Singapore
 Chwee kueh
 Cigaritis lohita
 Cigaritis syama
 Cinema of Singapore
 Cinemax (Asian TV channel)
 Circle Line (film)
 Circle MRT line
 Circle contact lens
 Circles.Life
 Circuit Road flat murder
 Citibank International Personal Bank Singapore
 Citibank Singapore
 Citizens' Party (Singapore)
 Citra Putri Sari Dewi
 City Constituency
 City Council of Singapore
 City Developments Limited
 City Energy
 City Hall MRT station
 City Hall, Singapore
 City Harvest Church
 City Harvest Church Criminal Breach of Trust Case
 City Shuttle Service
 City Square Mall
 City of Singapore (historical entity)
 CityLink Mall
 Civic District
 Civil Aviation Authority of Singapore
 Civil Defence Auxiliary Unit
 Civil Service College Singapore
 Civilian War Memorial
 Civmec
 Claire Chiang
 Claire Wong
 Clang Invasion
 Clarence Chew
 Clarence Lee (make-up artist)
 Clarence Tan
 Clarias nieuhofii
 Clarke Quay
 Clarke Quay MRT station
 Clarrie McCue
 Class 95 (radio station)
 Claude Massey
 Claypot rice
 Clean Energy Expo Asia
 CleanTech Park
 Clemen Chiang
 Clemenceau Bridge
 Clement Lim
 Clement Teo
 Clementi Bus Interchange
 Clementi Constituency
 Clementi MRT station
 Clementi Mall
 Clementi New Town
 Clementi Police Division
 Clementi Public Library
 Clementi Road
 Clementi Stadium
 Clementi Town Secondary School
 Clementi Woods Park
 Clementi rail accident
 Clementi, Singapore
 Cleopatra Wong
 Clermont Group
 Clicknetwork.tv
 Clifford Pier
 Clive Rees
 Clouds in My Coffee (film)
 Club 21
 Club Street
 Cluny Road railway station
 Clutched
 Clyde & Co
 Cnemaspis peninsularis
 Co-curricular activity (Singapore)
 Coastal fortifications of Singapore
 Coat of arms of Singapore
 Cobbold Commission
 Coca Steamboat
 Coconut jam
 Cocos (Keeling) Islands
 Code of Honour
 Cold Storage (supermarket)
 Cole Tinkler
 Coleman Bridge, Singapore
 Coleman House, Singapore
 Colette Wong
 Colgate Far East Open
 Colin Cheng
 Colin Cheong
 Colin Goh
 Colin Ng
 Colin Tan
 Collapse of Hotel New World
 Colleen Ang
 College of Medicine Building
 Collyer Quay
 Colombia at the 2010 Summer Youth Olympics
 Colony of Singapore
 Comcentre
 Come Closer With... Kewei
 Comedy Masala
 ComfortDelGro
 Commandos (Singapore Army)
 CommerceNet Singapore
 Commercial Affairs Department
 Commercial and Industrial Security Corporation
 Commissioner of Police (Singapore)
 Committee for Private Education
 Common green frog
 Common treeshrew
 Commonwealth Avenue Wet Market
 Commonwealth Cosmos FC
 Commonwealth MRT station
 Commonwealth Secondary School
 Commonwealth double murders
 Commonwealth, Singapore
 CommunicAsia
 Community Development Council
 Commuter worker
 Comoros at the 2010 Summer Youth Olympics
 Company police
 Company sergeant major
 Compass One
 Compassvale
 Compassvale LRT station
 Compassvale Secondary School
 Competition and Consumer Commission of Singapore
 Comprehensive Nuclear-Test-Ban Treaty
 Comprehensive and Progressive Agreement for Trans-Pacific Partnership
 Conergy
 Coney Island, Singapore
 Connaught Drive
 Conrad Centennial Singapore
 Conservatism in Singapore
 Constance Goh
 Constance Lau
 Constance Lien
 Constance Sheares
 Constance Singam
 Constance Song
 Constituencies of Singapore
 Constitution and Convention of the International Telecommunication Union
 Constitution of Singapore
 Constitution of the Asia-Pacific Telecommunity
 Constitution of the Food and Agriculture Organization
 Constitution of the International Labour Organization
 Constitution of the Republic of Singapore Tribunal
 Constitution of the United Nations Educational, Scientific and Cultural Organisation
 Constitution of the World Health Organization
 Contact Singapore
 Controversies surrounding Lee Hsien Loong
 Convention Concerning Customs Facilities for Touring
 Convention Relating to the Distribution of Programme-Carrying Signals Transmitted by Satellite
 Convention Relating to the Status of Stateless Persons
 Convention establishing a Customs Co-operation Council
 Convention establishing the Multilateral Investment Guarantee Agency
 Convention for the Mutual Recognition of Inspections in respect of the Manufacture of Pharmaceutical Products
 Convention for the Protection of New Varieties of Plants
 Convention for the Safeguarding of the Intangible Cultural Heritage
 Convention for the Suppression of Unlawful Acts against the Safety of Civil Aviation
 Convention for the Suppression of Unlawful Acts against the Safety of Maritime Navigation
 Convention for the Suppression of the Traffic in Persons and of the Exploitation of the Prostitution of Others
 Convention of the World Meteorological Organization
 Convention on Assistance in the Case of a Nuclear Accident or Radiological Emergency
 Convention on Biological Diversity
 Convention on Early Notification of a Nuclear Accident
 Convention on Limitation of Liability for Maritime Claims
 Convention on Mutual Administrative Assistance in Tax Matters
 Convention on Nuclear Safety
 Convention on Psychotropic Substances
 Convention on the Elimination of All Forms of Discrimination Against Women
 Convention on the International Hydrographic Organization
 Convention on the International Maritime Organization
 Convention on the International Mobile Satellite Organization
 Convention on the Marking of Plastic Explosives
 Convention on the Nationality of Married Women
 Convention on the Physical Protection of Nuclear Material
 Convention on the Privileges and Immunities of the Specialized Agencies
 Convention on the Privileges and Immunities of the United Nations
 Convention on the Recognition and Enforcement of Foreign Arbitral Awards
 Convention on the Rights of Persons with Disabilities
 Convention on the Rights of the Child
 Convention on the Safety of United Nations and Associated Personnel
 Convention on the Settlement of Investment Disputes between States and Nationals of Other States
 Convention relating to International Exhibitions
 Conventional Multirole Combat Rifle
 Conway Pulford
 Cook Islands at the 2010 Summer Youth Olympics
 Cooku with Comali (season 4)
 Coordinating Minister for Economic Policies
 Coordinating Minister for Infrastructure (Singapore)
 Coordinating Minister for National Security (Singapore)
 Coordinating Minister for Social Policies
 Coral Edge LRT station
 Cordlife
 Corey Warren Cuelho
 Cornerstone Community Church
 Corporal
 Corporal first class
 Corporate affairs of Singapore Airlines
 Corporation MRT station
 Corrective work order
 Corridor (short story collection)
 Corrinne May
 Corrupt Practices Investigation Bureau
 Corruption in Singapore
 Cosmic Armchair
 Costa Rica at the 2010 Summer Youth Olympics
 Council for Estate Agencies
 Council of Churches of Malaysia
 Count On Me Singapore
 Counter-terrorism in Singapore
 Courage Investment Group
 Court of Appeal of Singapore
 Courts Singapore
 Cove LRT station
 Covenant Evangelical Free Church
 CozyCot
 Crab bee hoon
 Crab-eating macaque
 Craig Foster
 Craig Road (Singapore)
 Crawford Constituency
 Crawford, Singapore
 Crawfurd Hospital
 Crazy Rich Asians
 Crazy Rich Asians (film)
 Creative MuVo
 Creative MuVo player models
 Creative NOMAD
 Creative Technology
 Creative Vado
 Creative Wave Blaster
 Creative Wireless Speakers
 Creative Zen
 Creativeans
 Crescendo (TV series)
 Crescent Girls' School
 Crest Secondary School
 Crime Busters x 2
 Crime in Singapore
 Crimewatch (Singaporean TV series)
 Criminal Investigation Department (Singapore)
 Criminal Law (Temporary Provisions) Act
 Criminal law of Singapore
 Cristiano Fitzgerald
 Croatia at the 2010 Summer Youth Olympics
 Cross Island MRT line
 Cross Street
 Crouching Tiger Hidden Ghost
 Cruz Teng
 Crypto.com
 Crystal Jade
 Crystal Mover
 Crystal Wong
 Cub Scouts (Singapore Scout Association)
 Cuba at the 2010 Summer Youth Olympics
 Cui Yu
 Cultural Medallion
 Culture of Singapore
 Cupha erymanthis
 Cupido lacturnus
 Curetis saronis
 Curry mee
 Curry puff
 Curtin Education Centre
 Customs Convention on Containers
 Customs Convention on the ATA Carnet for the Temporary Admission of Goods
 Customs Convention on the Temporary Importation for Private Use of Aircraft and Pleasure Boats
 Customs Convention on the Temporary Importation of Commercial Road Vehicles
 Customs Convention on the Temporary Importation of Private Road Vehicles
 Cyber Intelligence House
 Cyber Security Agency
 Cyberathlete Professional League
 Cycle & Carriage
 Cycling at the 2010 Summer Youth Olympics
 Cycling at the 2010 Summer Youth Olympics – Boys' BMX
 Cycling at the 2010 Summer Youth Olympics – Boys' cross country
 Cycling at the 2010 Summer Youth Olympics – Boys' road race
 Cycling at the 2010 Summer Youth Olympics – Boys' time trial
 Cycling at the 2010 Summer Youth Olympics – Combined mixed team
 Cycling at the 2010 Summer Youth Olympics – Girls' BMX
 Cycling at the 2010 Summer Youth Olympics – Girls' cross country
 Cycling at the 2010 Summer Youth Olympics – Girls' time trial
 Cycling at the 2015 Southeast Asian Games
 Cylindrophis ruffus
 Cynthia Chua
 Cynthia Koh
 Cynthia Phua
 Cyprus at the 2010 Summer Youth Olympics
 Cyril Wong
 Cyrtodactylus quadrivirgatus
 Czech Republic at the 2010 Summer Youth Olympics

D

 D. Tokijan
 DBS Bank
 DBS Bank (Hong Kong)
 DEN/ICE Agreements
 DFI Retail Group
 DHL Balloon
 DP Architects
 DPMM FC
 DSO National Laboratories
 DTAC
 DUO
 Da Butcherman
 Dadar gulung
 Daddy at Home
 Dai Tielang
 Daichi Ishiyama
 Daichi Omori
 Daichi Tanabe
 Daiki Asaoka
 Dairy Farm Nature Park
 Daisy Devan
 Daisy Irani
 Daisy Vaithilingam
 Daizo Horikoshi
 Dakota Crescent
 Dakota MRT station
 Dalforce
 Dalhousie Obelisk
 Dalian Shide Siwu FC
 Damai LRT station (Singapore)
 Damai Secondary School
 Damenlou Hotel
 Damian Matacz
 Damien Sin
 Dan Ito
 Dan Tan
 Danaus chrysippus
 Danaus genutia
 Danaus melanippus
 Dance Dance Dragon
 Dance in Singapore
 Dancing Forever World Tour
 Dancing Girl (Singapore sculpture)
 Danelle Tan
 Danial Farhan Tan
 Danial Scott Crichton
 Danie Dharma
 Daniel Au Yeong
 Daniel Bennett (footballer)
 Daniel Fernandez (chess player)
 Daniel Goh
 Daniel Goh (footballer)
 Daniel Hammond
 Daniel Heryanto
 Daniel L. Shields
 Daniel Lian
 Daniel Liew
 Daniel Martens
 Daniel Morgan (private investigator)
 Daniel Ong
 Daniel Yun
 Danielithosia immaculata
 Danish Irfan Azman
 Danny Bawa Chrisnanta
 Danny Chew Ji Xiang
 Danny Yeo
 Danny Yeo (swimmer)
 Dante Chen
 Dao Heng Bank
 Daphne Chia
 Daphne Khoo
 Daren Shiau
 Daren Tan
 Daren Tang
 Darjah Utama Bakti Cemerlang
 Darjah Utama Bakti Cemerlang (Tentera)
 Darjah Utama Nila Utama
 Darjah Utama Temasek
 Dark Sunset
 Dark-tailed tree rat
 Darlene Lim
 Darren Chua
 Darren Lim
 Darren Low
 Darren Ng
 Darren Stewart (soccer)
 Darren Teh
 Darryl David
 Darryl Yong
 Darshan Singh (executioner)
 Daryl Aiden Yow
 Daryl Arnold
 Daryl Ng
 Dasia grisea
 Dasmond Koh
 Data Storage Institute
 Datchinamurthy Kataiah
 Datuk Keramat
 David Abeel
 David Aiers
 David Bala
 David Cervinski
 David Chong
 David Elias Building
 David Howell (chess player)
 David I. Adelman
 David J. Murnane
 David Lee (Singaporean footballer)
 David Leo
 David Lim (mountaineer)
 David Lim (swimmer)
 David Lim (water polo)
 David Lim Kim San
 David Low (footballer)
 David Marshall (Singaporean politician)
 David McNicol (diplomat)
 David Murray-Lyon
 David Neo
 David Ong
 David Tan
 Davinder Singh (lawyer)
 Davor Dželalija
 Davor Piškor
 Dawn Gan
 Dawn Ng
 Dawn Xiana Moon
 Dawn Yeoh
 Daúd Gazale
 De La Salle School, Singapore
 Deal or No Deal (Singaporean game show)
 DealStreetAsia
 Dear, Dear Son-In-Law
 Death and state funeral of Lee Kuan Yew
 Death in Singapore
 Death of Annie Ee
 Death of Ayakannu Marithamuthu
 Death of Darren Ng Wei Jie
 Death of Felicia Teo
 Death of Lim Shiow Rong
 Death of Ramapiram Kannickaisparry
 Death of Shane Todd
 Death of Winnifred Teo
 Death of a Perm Sec
 Debbie Ding
 Deborah Emmanuel
 Deborah Ong
 Deborah Tsai
 December 1949 Singapore Municipal Commission election
 Declaration of Religious Harmony
 Dee Kosh
 Defence Science and Technology Agency
 Defu Industrial Park
 Defu MRT station
 Dejan Gluščević
 Delfi Limited
 Delias hyparete
 Delias pasithoe
 Della Butcher
 Della Lee
 Delta Constituency
 Delta Sports Complex
 Delvin Goh
 Delwinder Singh
 Demis Hassabis
 Democratic Party (Singapore)
 Democratic Progressive Party (Singapore)
 Democratic Republic of the Congo at the 2010 Summer Youth Olympics
 Demographics of Singapore
 Dendrelaphis caudolineatus
 Dendrelaphis formosus
 Denis Lian
 Denis McSwiney
 Denise Camillia Tan
 Denise Keller
 Denise Lim
 Denise Phua
 Denmark at the 2010 Summer Youth Olympics
 Dennis Chew
 Dennis Lim
 Dennis Tan
 Denny Setiawan
 Depart
 Depot Road
 Depot Road Zhen Shan Mei Claypot Laksa
 Deputy Commissioner of Police (Singapore)
 Deputy Prime Minister of Singapore
 Derek Wong
 Derrick Goh
 Derrick Hoh
 Design Orchard
 Design, Build and Sell Scheme
 Desmond Chiam
 Desmond Choo
 Desmond Koh
 Desmond Kon
 Desmond Kuek
 Desmond Lee (Singaporean politician)
 Desmond Lim
 Desmond Ng
 Desmond Oh
 Desmond Sim
 Desmond Tan (actor)
 Desmond Tan (politician)
 Desney Tan
 Despicable Me Minion Mayhem
 Destiny in Her Hands
 Deudorix epijarbas
 Deus Ex Machina (heavy metal band)
 Devan Nair
 Devarajan Varadarajan
 Devasahayam David Chelliah
 Devil's curry
 Devotion (TV series)
 Deyi Secondary School
 Dharanath Bhattacharya
 Dhoby Ghaut
 Dhoby Ghaut Green
 Dhoby Ghaut MRT station
 Diana Plumpton
 Diana Ser
 Dice Soccer
 Dick Lee
 Dickenson Hill Road
 Diego Gama (Brazilian footballer)
 Diego Silvas
 Dieppe Barracks
 Digital Economy Partnership Agreement
 Dileep Nair
 Dilhan Pillay Sandrasegara
 Dillenia reticulata
 Dim Sum Dollies
 Dim sum
 Din Tai Fung
 Dinah Chan
 Ding Haifeng
 Ding Yi Music Company
 Dinosaur Train
 Diocese of Singapore (Russian Orthodox Church)
 Diogo Caramelo
 Dior Lowhorn
 Diospyros coriacea
 Dipna Lim Prasad
 Direct School Admission
 Dirge (album)
 Disability in Singapore
 Disaster Assistance and Rescue Team
 Disclosed
 Discophora sondaica
 Discuss Disgust
 Disease Outbreak Response System Condition
 Disney Networks Group Asia Pacific
 Disney XD (Southeast Asian TV channel)
 Disneyland with the Death Penalty
 Distance (2015 film)
 Districts of Singapore
 Diva (Asian TV channel)
 Diving at the 2009 Asian Youth Games
 Diving at the 2010 Summer Youth Olympics
 Diving at the 2010 Summer Youth Olympics – Boys' 10m platform
 Diving at the 2010 Summer Youth Olympics – Boys' 3m springboard
 Diving at the 2010 Summer Youth Olympics – Girls' 10m platform
 Diving at the 2010 Summer Youth Olympics – Girls' 3m springboard
 Diving at the 2015 Southeast Asian Games
 Diviya G K
 Divya Victor
 Diwali
 Dixie Tan
 Djatikoesoemo
 Djibouti at the 2010 Summer Youth Olympics
 Dnata Singapore
 Doctrine of bias in Singapore law
 Doha Amendment to the Kyoto Protocol
 Doleschallia bisaltide
 Dolichoderus crawleyi
 Dollah Hamid
 Dollah Kassim
 Dollardex
 Dominic Tan
 Dominica at the 2010 Summer Youth Olympics
 Dominican Republic at the 2010 Summer Youth Olympics
 Don Bosco (author)
 Don Dulay
 Don Quijote (store)
 Don Wee
 Don't Forget the Lyrics! (Singaporean game show)
 Don't Stop Believin' (TV series)
 Don't Worry, Be Healthy
 Donald Koh
 Donkey Live
 Donna Ong
 Doppelganger (TV series)
 Doreen Liu
 Dorsett Hospitality International
 Dosa (food)
 Double Bonus
 Double Happiness (TV series)
 Double Happiness II
 Double Tenth incident
 Douglas Foo
 Douglas Moore (football manager)
 Douhua
 Dover Court International School
 Dover MRT station
 Dover, Singapore
 Downtown Core
 Downtown MRT line
 Downtown MRT station
 Dr. Sbaitso
 Draco abbreviatus
 Dragan Talajić
 Dražen Gović
 Dream Coder
 Dream Walker (comic)
 DreamWorks Animation in amusement parks
 DreamWorks Channel
 Drew & Napier
 Drigar Thubten Dargye Ling
 Driving in Singapore
 Driving licence in Singapore
 Dropsuite
 Drug Houses of Australia
 Dryophiops rubescens
 Duck Den murder
 Duck rice
 Dudley Ridout
 Duke–NUS Medical School
 Dulwich College Singapore
 Duncan David Elias
 Duncan Macintosh
 Duncan Watt
 Dunman High School
 Dunman Secondary School
 Dusan Marinkovic
 Dustpan Recordings
 Duxton Hill
 Dwarf pygmy goby
 Dwayne Tan
 DyStar
 Dymon Asia
 Dynda
 Dyson (company)

E

 E! (Asian TV channel)
 E-mu 20K
 E-mu Systems
 E. J. H. Corner
 E. W. Gunatilaka
 ECNAD
 EFTPOS
 EMAS (company)
 EOY Cosplay Festival
 ERA APAC Centre
 ES Power Singapore
 ESPZEN
 ESSEC Business School
 ESys Technologies
 EU Centre in Singapore
 EZ-Link
 Early Childhood Development Agency
 Early Founders Memorial Stone
 Early history of Singapore
 EarthFest Singapore
 East Asia School of Theology
 East Asia Tonight
 East Asian Institute (Singapore)
 East Coast Group Representation Constituency
 East Coast Integrated Depot
 East Coast Park
 East Coast Parkway
 East Coast Road, Singapore
 East India Company
 East Region, Singapore
 East Spring Secondary School
 East Timor at the 2010 Summer Youth Olympics
 East Timor at the 2015 Southeast Asian Games
 Eastern Health Alliance
 Eastern Min
 Eastern News Agency, Singapore
 Eastern Orthodox Metropolitanate of Singapore and South Asia
 Eastern and Oriental Express
 Eastpoint Mall, Singapore
 East–West MRT line
 Eat Already?
 Eat Already? 2
 Eat Already? 3
 Eat Already? 4
 Eat Frozen Pork
 Eban Hyams
 Ebbing Air National Guard Base
 Echoing Love
 Eco 4 the World
 Eco-Link@BKE
 Economic Development Board
 Economic statistics of Singapore
 Economy of Singapore
 Economy rice
 Ecuador at the 2010 Summer Youth Olympics
 Eddie Chin
 Eddie Teo
 Eddy Viator
 Eden Hall, Singapore
 Edgefield Secondary School
 Edgeworth Beresford David
 Editions Didier Millet
 Edmund Augustus Blundell
 Edmund Chen
 Edmund Sim
 Edmund W. Barker
 EduTrust
 Eduardo Saverin
 Education in Singapore
 Edusave
 Edward Alexander Irving
 Edward Anson
 Edward Boustead
 Edward Chia
 Edward Lee Kwong Foo
 Edward Lewis Brockman
 Edward Shaw Hose
 Edward Tan
 Edwin Doraisamy
 Edwin Ferdinand Lee
 Edwin Goh
 Edwin M. Cronk
 Edwin Thumboo
 Edwin Tong
 Ee Hoe Hean Club
 Ee Peng Liang
 Eelyn Kok
 Egg tart
 Egmar Gonçalves
 Egypt at the 2010 Summer Youth Olympics
 Ehvin Sasidharan
 Eid al-Adha
 Eid al-Fitr
 Eighteen Chefs
 Eighth Lee Kuan Yew Cabinet
 Eiichiro Ozaki
 Eileen Chong
 Eileen Fogarty
 Eileen Yeow
 Einstein Kristiansen
 Eisaku Satō
 Ekachai Uekrongtham
 Eko Pradana Putra
 El Salvador at the 2010 Summer Youth Olympics
 Eleanor Lee
 Eleanor Wong (playwright)
 Elections Department Singapore
 Elections in Singapore
 Electricity sector in Singapore
 Electrico
 Electronic Communications Convention
 Electronic Filing System
 Electronic Road Pricing
 Element Magazine
 Elephant statue
 Elephant trunk snake
 Elgin Bridge (Singapore)
 Eli T.
 Elias MRT station
 Elijah Lim Teck Yong
 Elim Chew
 Elim Church Singapore
 Elisa Yukie Yokoyama
 Elizabeth Choy
 Elizabeth Haigh
 Elizabeth Yin
 Ellen Lee
 Ellenborough Market
 Ellice Handy
 Ellis Road
 Elly Yunara
 Elson Soh
 Elvin Ng
 Elymnias hypermnestra
 Embassy of Indonesia, Singapore
 Embassy of Singapore, Manila
 Embassy of Singapore, Washington, D.C.
 Embassy of Switzerland, Singapore
 Embassy of the Philippines, Singapore
 Embassy of the United States, Singapore
 Embry-Riddle Aeronautical University Asia
 Emerald Hill, Singapore
 Emerio
 Emile Czaja
 Emily Sadka
 Emily of Emerald Hill
 Emir Lotinac
 Emma Yong
 Emmalocera leucocinctus
 Emmanuel Daniel
 Emmanuel Emuejeraye
 Emmanuel Maboang
 Emmanuel Unaka
 Emmeric Ong
 Empat perkataan
 Employment Service Convention, 1948
 Employment in Singapore
 Empress Place Building
 Emyl Leclercq
 En Bloc
 Encore Films
 Endurance-class landing platform dock
 Energizer
 Energy Carta
 Energy Market Authority
 Energy Studies Institute
 Energy in Singapore
 Eng Foong Ho v Attorney-General
 Eng Leong Medallic Industries
 Eng Tow
 Eng Wah Global
 Enlistment Act 1970
 Ennuyire (TV series)
 Enrich Professional Publishing
 Ensar Brunčević
 Ensoniq
 Ensoniq AudioPCI
 Enterprise MRT station
 Enterprise Singapore
 Environmental Audio Extensions
 Environmental issues in Singapore
 Epicrocis oegnusalis
 Epigram Books
 Equal Remuneration Convention
 Equality of Treatment (Accident Compensation) Convention, 1925
 Equator Art Society
 Equatorial Guinea at the 2010 Summer Youth Olympics
 Equatorial Space Systems
 Equestrian at the 2010 Summer Youth Olympics
 Equestrian at the 2010 Summer Youth Olympics – Individual jumping
 Equestrian at the 2010 Summer Youth Olympics – Team jumping
 Equestrian at the 2015 Southeast Asian Games
 Eric Butcher
 Eric Chiryoku
 Eric Chua
 Eric Griffith-Jones
 Eric Khoo
 Eric Low
 Eric Moo
 Eric Obinna Chukwunyelu
 Eric Paine
 Eric Sim
 Eric Virgin (diplomat)
 Eric Xu
 Eric Yeo
 Eric Young (footballer, born 1960)
 Erika Tan
 Erinna Lee
 Erionota thrax
 Eritrea at the 2010 Summer Youth Olympics
 Ernest John Spooner
 Ernest Steven Monteiro
 Ernest Wilton
 Ernie Tapai
 Erotic Stories for Punjabi Widows
 Erskine Road
 Ervin Boban
 Esad Sejdic
 Escape Theme Park
 Escape from Paradise
 Esco (Singaporean company)
 Esplanade Bridge
 Esplanade MRT station
 Esplanade Park
 Esplanade – Theatres on the Bay
 Esplanade, Singapore
 Esther Tan
 Estonia at the 2010 Summer Youth Olympics
 Ethiopia at the 2010 Summer Youth Olympics
 Ethos Books
 EtonHouse International Education Group
 Eu Chooi Yip
 Eu Tong Sen
 Eu Tong Sen Street
 Eu Yan Sang
 Euchrysops cnejus
 Eugene Tan
 Eugene Thuraisingam
 Eunice Olsen
 Eunoia Junior College
 Eunos Bus Interchange
 Eunos Constituency
 Eunos Crescent FC
 Eunos Group Representation Constituency
 Eunos MRT station
 Euphoria (American TV series)
 Euploea crameri
 Euploea mulciber
 Euploea radamanthus
 Euploea tulliolus
 Eurasian Singaporeans
 Eurasian cuisine of Singapore and Malaysia
 Eurema andersonii
 Eurema blanda
 Eurema hecabe
 Eurema sari
 Eurema simulatrix
 European Union–Singapore Free Trade Agreement
 Eurosport
 Eurosport 1
 Euthalia aconthea
 Euthalia monina
 Eutropis rugifera
 Evan Davies (missionary)
 Evangelical Lutheran Church in Malaysia
 Evelyn Chan
 Evelyn Lim
 Evelyn Norris
 Evelyn Tan
 Everbright Water
 Evergreen Secondary School
 Everton Park, Singapore
 Every Singaporean Son
 Every Singaporean Son II – The Making of an Officer
 Every Singaporean Son – Epilogue
 Everybody's Business (2013 film)
 Everyone (Olympics song)
 Everything but the Brain
 Evil Singing Pandas
 Evolve MMA
 Exclusion of judicial review in Singapore law
 Execution of Nagaenthran K. Dharmalingam
 Exercise Deep Sabre
 Experian, Singapore
 Expo MRT station
 Expressways of Singapore
 Extreme Gourmet
 Ezekiel Saleh Manasseh
 Ezra Holdings

F

 FAS Premier League
 FH-2000
 FH-88
 Fabian Kwok
 Fabian Tan
 Fabien Lewis
 Fabrice Noël
 Face Off (Singaporean talk show)
 Facilities on the Mass Rapid Transit (Singapore)
 Fadhil Noh
 Fadhil Salim
 Fadli Kamis
 Fadzuhasny Juraimi
 Faeryville
 Fahrudin Aličković
 Fahrudin Mustafić
 Fair Consideration Framework
 Fairfield Methodist Schools
 Fairmont Singapore
 Fairoz Hasan
 Fairy of the Chalice
 Faith Community Baptist Church
 Faith Methodist Church
 Faith Ng
 Faith and Globalisation Initiative
 Faiz Salleh
 Faizah Jamal
 Faizal Hamid
 Faizal Raffi
 Faizal Roslan
 Fajar LRT station
 Fajar Secondary School
 Fakkah Fuzz
 Fall of Singapore
 Fallen Angel (Singaporean-Malaysian TV series)
 Fallin (album)
 Falling in Love (TV series)
 Family Justice Courts
 Family Matters (Singaporean TV series)
 Family law of Singapore
 Family planning in Singapore
 Fandi Ahmad
 Fann Wong
 Fanntasy
 Fantasy Island, Singapore
 Far East Orchard
 Far East Organization
 Far East Plaza
 Far Eastern Bible College
 Fareez Farhan
 Fares and ticketing on the Mass Rapid Transit (Singapore)
 Farhan Hairoddin
 Farhan Zulkifli
 Farhanna Farid
 Faris Ramli
 Faritz Abdul Hameed
 Farizal Basri
 Farmway LRT station
 Farouq Farkhan
 Farrer Park
 Farrer Park Constituency
 Farrer Park Field
 Farrer Park Hospital
 Farrer Park MRT station
 Farrer Park United
 Farrer Park address
 Farrer Road MRT station
 Fashah Iskandar
 Fast Response Car
 Fathullah bin Rahmat
 Fatimah Lateef
 Fatimah binte Sulaiman
 Fauna of Singapore
 Faunis canens
 Fauziah Ibrahim
 Fazli Ayob
 Fazli Jaffar
 Fazrul Nawaz
 Fearless-class patrol vessel
 Federated Malay States Railways
 Federated States of Micronesia at the 2010 Summer Youth Olympics
 Federation of Malaya
 Federico Martínez (footballer, born 1984)
 Feiping Chang
 Felicia Chin
 Felicia Tang
 Felix Barrientos
 Felix Cheong
 Fencing at the 2010 Summer Youth Olympics
 Fencing at the 2010 Summer Youth Olympics – Cadet female foil
 Fencing at the 2010 Summer Youth Olympics – Cadet female sabre
 Fencing at the 2010 Summer Youth Olympics – Cadet female épée
 Fencing at the 2010 Summer Youth Olympics – Cadet male foil
 Fencing at the 2010 Summer Youth Olympics – Cadet male sabre
 Fencing at the 2010 Summer Youth Olympics – Cadet male épée
 Fencing at the 2010 Summer Youth Olympics – Mixed team
 Fencing at the 2015 Southeast Asian Games
 Fencing at the 2015 Southeast Asian Games – Men's foil
 Fencing at the 2015 Southeast Asian Games – Men's sabre
 Fencing at the 2015 Southeast Asian Games – Men's team foil
 Fencing at the 2015 Southeast Asian Games – Men's team sabre
 Fencing at the 2015 Southeast Asian Games – Men's team épée
 Fencing at the 2015 Southeast Asian Games – Men's épée
 Fencing at the 2015 Southeast Asian Games – Women's foil
 Fencing at the 2015 Southeast Asian Games – Women's sabre
 Fencing at the 2015 Southeast Asian Games – Women's team foil
 Fencing at the 2015 Southeast Asian Games – Women's team sabre
 Fencing at the 2015 Southeast Asian Games – Women's team épée
 Fencing at the 2015 Southeast Asian Games – Women's épée
 Feng Tianwei
 Fengshan Single Member Constituency
 Ferdinand Marcos
 Ferial Ashraff
 Ferlyn Wong
 Fernvale LRT station
 Fernvale, Singapore
 Festival of Praise
 Fettering of discretion in Singapore administrative law
 Fico Sports Hub
 Field hockey at the 2010 Summer Youth Olympics
 Field hockey at the 2010 Summer Youth Olympics – Boys' tournament
 Field hockey at the 2010 Summer Youth Olympics – Girls' tournament
 Field hockey at the 2015 Southeast Asian Games
 Fifth Lee Hsien Loong Cabinet
 Fifth Lee Kuan Yew Cabinet
 Fighting Spiders
 Figments of Experience
 Fiji at the 2010 Summer Youth Olympics
 Fikri Junaidi
 File sharing in Singapore
 Filipinos in Singapore
 FilmTack
 Finding 8
 Finian Tan
 Finishing Line
 Finland at the 2010 Summer Youth Olympics
 Finlayson Green
 Fiona Bruce
 Fiona Cheong
 Fiona Fussi
 Fiona Xie
 Firas Irwan
 Firdaus Idros
 Firdaus Kasman
 Fire Up
 Fireboats in Singapore
 First Class (TV series)
 First David Marshall Cabinet
 First Generation (sculpture)
 First Geneva Convention
 First Goh Chok Tong Cabinet
 First Lee Hsien Loong Cabinet
 First Lee Kuan Yew Cabinet
 First Lim Yew Hock Cabinet
 First Touch
 First information report
 First sergeant
 First warrant officer
 Firstfruits publications
 Fish ball
 Fish head curry
 Fish moolie
 Fish soup bee hoon
 Fishingkaki
 Fit for Fashion (season 2)
 Five Cs of Singapore
 Five Power Defence Arrangements
 Five-foot way
 Flag of Singapore
 Flavien Michelini
 Fleabag Monkeyface
 Flex (company)
 Floods in Singapore
 Floorball at the 2015 Southeast Asian Games
 Floorball at the 2015 Southeast Asian Games – Men's tournament
 Floorball at the 2015 Southeast Asian Games – Women's tournament
 Flor Contemplacion
 Flora of Singapore
 Florence Tan
 Flos diardi
 Flos fulgida
 Fly Away (Corrinne May album)
 Flying Chalks
 Fo Shan Ting Da Bo Gong Temple
 Focus on the Family Singapore
 Fodé Bangaly Diakité
 Folklore (TV series)
 Fong Chi Chung
 Fong Chong Pik
 Fong Kay Yian
 Foo Hai Ch'an Monastery
 Foo Mee Har
 Foo Swee Chin
 Food Bank Singapore
 Food Republic
 Foodpanda
 Football 5-a-side at the 2015 ASEAN Para Games
 Football 7-a-side at the 2014 Asian Para Games
 Football 7-a-side at the 2015 ASEAN Para Games
 Football Association of Singapore
 Football Leagues in Singapore
 Football at the 1973 Southeast Asian Peninsular Games
 Football at the 1975 Southeast Asian Peninsular Games
 Football at the 1983 Southeast Asian Games
 Football at the 1985 Brunei Merdeka Games
 Football at the 1986 Brunei Merdeka Games
 Football at the 1993 Southeast Asian Games
 Football at the 2007 Southeast Asian Games
 Football at the 2009 Asian Youth Games
 Football at the 2010 Summer Youth Olympics
 Football at the 2010 Summer Youth Olympics – Boys' tournament
 Football at the 2010 Summer Youth Olympics – Girls' tournament
 Football at the 2015 Southeast Asian Games
 Football at the 2015 Southeast Asian Games – Group A
 Football at the 2015 Southeast Asian Games – Group B
 Football at the 2015 Southeast Asian Games – Knockout stage
 Football at the 2015 Southeast Asian Games – Men's team squads
 Football in Singapore
 Forbidden City: Portrait of An Empress
 Foreign Employee Dormitories Act 2015
 Foreign Interference (Countermeasures) Act 2021
 Foreign Sports Talent Scheme
 Foreign relations of Singapore
 Foreign territories in Singapore
 Foreign territories of Singapore
 Forensic Medicine Division
 Forever Fever
 Forfar House
 Former Admiralty House
 Former Command House
 Former Ford Factory
 Former Indian National Army Monument
 Former National Stadium, Singapore
 Former Queen's Theatre, Singapore
 Former Saint Joseph's Institution
 Former Singapore Badminton Hall
 Former cemeteries in Singapore
 Formidable-class frigate
 Forrest Li
 Fort Canning
 Fort Canning Hill
 Fort Canning Lighthouse
 Fort Canning MRT station
 Fort Canning Tunnel
 Fort Pasir Panjang
 Fort Serapong
 Fort Siloso
 Fort Tanjong Katong
 Forum The Shopping Mall
 Foss Shanahan
 Founders' Memorial
 Founders' Memorial MRT station
 Founding years of modern Singapore
 Founding of modern Singapore and its early colonial period
 Fountain Gardens
 Fountain of Wealth
 Four Asian Tigers
 Four Mansions
 Four Million Smiles
 Fourth Geneva Convention
 Fourth Goh Chok Tong Cabinet
 Fourth Lee Hsien Loong Cabinet
 Fourth Lee Kuan Yew Cabinet
 Fox Action Movies
 Fox Family Movies
 Fox Sports (Asian TV network)
 Fran Borgia
 France at the 2010 Summer Youth Olympics
 Frances Liu
 France–Singapore relations
 Francis Chan (bishop)
 Francis Hollis
 Francis J. Galbraith
 Francis James Bernard
 Francis Liang
 Francis Seow
 Francis Yuen
 Franco Chiviló
 Frank Cooper Sands
 Frank Keith Simmons
 Frank Lavin
 Frank Oh
 Frank Swettenham
 Frank Tsao
 Franklin Anzité
 Franklin Gimson
 Franklin and Friends
 François Perrodo
 Fraser and Neave
 Frasers Property
 Frasers Property Australia
 Fred Fernandez
 Freddy Boey
 Frederick George Penney
 Frederick Nutter Chasen
 Frederick Seton James
 Frederick Weld
 Freedom of religion in Singapore
 Freedom to Create
 Freida Lim
 French-speaking Catholic Community of Singapore
 Friends Forever (TV series)
 Fritz Nilsen
 From Beijing to Moscow
 From M.E. to Myself
 Frédéric Mendy (footballer, born 1988)
 Fu Lu Shou Complex
 Fu Mingtian
 Fuad Ramli
 Fuchun Secondary School
 Fuhua Secondary School
 Fuji Xerox Towers
 Fuk Tak Chi Temple
 Fullerton Health Group
 Fumiya Kobayashi
 Fumiya Kogure
 Fumiya Suzuki (footballer, born 1998)
 Funan DigitaLife Mall
 Funan, Singapore
 Funding Societies
 Fusionopolis
 Futbolita
 Future developments in Singapore

G

 G. Carlos Smith
 G. K. Sanghar
 G. Ramachandran
 GES International
 GIC (Singaporean sovereign wealth fund)
 GL Limited
 GLP (company)
 GLX Digital
 GV Yishun
 Gabon at the 2010 Summer Youth Olympics
 Gabriel Quak
 Gaiyathiri Murugayan
 Gajah Gallery
 Gali Batu Depot
 Galing Kujat
 Gallery Hotel
 Gambling in Singapore
 Game Plan (TV series)
 Gamu Tasaka
 Gan Ching Hwee
 Gan Eng Seng
 Gan Eng Seng School
 Gan Eng Seng School Founding Site
 Gan Eng Teck
 Gan Kim Yong
 Gan Siow Huang
 Gan Thiam Poh
 Gandaca harina
 Gangara thyrsis
 Gao Hongbo
 Gao Ning
 Garcha Hotels
 Gardenasia
 Gardenia Foods
 Gardens by the Bay
 Gardens by the Bay MRT station
 Garena
 Garena Premier League
 Gareth Low
 Garnet Bougoure
 Gary Blissett
 Gary Loo
 Gary Quinlan
 Gary Steven Robbat
 Gary Tan (swimmer, born 1973)
 Gary Tan (swimmer, born 1982)
 Gary Yeo
 Gaston Dutronquoy
 Gastronomy in Singapore
 Gatekeepers (game show)
 Gaudy Boy
 Gaurav Keerthi
 Gavin Lee (football coach)
 Gavin Wilkinson
 Gay World Amusement Park
 Gayatri Shunmugam
 GeBIZ
 GeTai Challenge
 GeTai Challenge (season 1)
 GeTai Challenge (season 2)
 Gedung Kuning
 Geh Min
 Geison Moura
 Gek Poh MRT station
 Gek Poh Ville
 Gekko kuhli
 Gen Neo
 General Agreement on Tariffs and Trade
 General Agreement on Trade in Services
 General Certificate of Education
 General elections in Singapore
 Geneva Convention on Road Traffic
 Geneva Frequency Plan of 1975
 Geneva Protocol
 Genevieve Chua
 Genevieve Woo
 Genki Sushi
 Genocide Convention
 Genting Group
 Genting Singapore
 Gentle Bones
 Gentle Bones discography
 Geoffrey Allan Crossley
 Geoffroy's rousette
 Geography of Singapore
 Geology of Singapore
 Geophagus altifrons
 George Bonham
 George Bridgewater
 George Douglas-Hamilton, 10th Earl of Selkirk
 George Drumgoole Coleman
 George Goutzioulis
 George Hemmant
 George Jacobs (educator)
 George Kulcsar
 George Leong
 George Oehlers
 George Radda
 George Tan
 George Vance Allen
 George Warren Wood
 George Yeo
 George Young (actor)
 Georgette Chen
 Georgia at the 2010 Summer Youth Olympics
 Georgina Chang
 Gerald Giam
 Gerald Hensley
 Gerald Koh
 Gerald Koh (swimmer)
 Geraldine Lee
 Gerard Ee
 Gerarda prevostiana
 Gergely Ghéczy
 German European School Singapore
 German Girl Shrine
 Germany at the 2010 Summer Youth Olympics
 Germany's Next Topmodel (season 4)
 Germany's Next Topmodel (season 9)
 Germany–Singapore relations
 Gerosis phisara
 Get Your Sexy Back
 Getai
 Geungsi
 Gevorg Sargsyan
 Geylang
 Geylang Bahru
 Geylang Bahru MRT station
 Geylang Bahru family murders
 Geylang Constituency
 Geylang East
 Geylang East Constituency
 Geylang East Public Library
 Geylang International FC
 Geylang Methodist School (Secondary)
 Geylang River
 Geylang Road
 Geylang Serai Constituency
 Geylang West Single Member Constituency
 Ghana at the 2010 Summer Youth Olympics
 Ghee Hin Kongsi
 Ghib Ojisan
 Ghim Moh
 Ghost Child
 Ghost Festival
 Ghost on Air
 Giam Choo Kwee
 Giant (hypermarket)
 Giant mudskipper
 Gifted (Singaporean TV series)
 Gifted Education Programme (Singapore)
 Gilbert Bayonne
 Gillman Barracks
 Gilson Varela
 Gimmy Bade
 Gina Chua
 Ginger tea
 Giovanni Moretti (bishop)
 Girl Guides Singapore
 Girls' Sports Club
 Giti Tire
 Glen Goei
 Glen Lim Jun Wei
 Glenda Chong
 Gleneagles Hospital
 Glenn Knight
 Glenn Kweh
 Glenn Marine Group
 Glenn Ong
 Glenn Ong Jing Jie
 Glenn Yong
 Gligor Gligorov
 Glints (platform)
 Global Esports Federation
 Global Fashion Group
 Global Indian International School, Singapore
 Gloria Lim
 Glory (kickboxing)
 Go-Ahead Singapore
 Goalball at the 2015 ASEAN Para Games
 Gobi Avedian
 GodsWar Online
 Goh Beng Kwan
 Goh Cheng Liang
 Goh Chok Tong
 Goh Choo San
 Goh Choon Huat
 Goh Choon Phong
 Goh Chui Ling
 Goh Eng Wah
 Goh Hup Jin
 Goh Keng Swee
 Goh Lay Kuan
 Goh Meng Seng
 Goh Poh Seng
 Goh Si Hou
 Goh Siew Tin
 Goh Sin Tub
 Goh Soo Khim
 Goh Soon Tioe
 Goh Swee Swee
 Goh Tat Chuan
 Goh Wei Ming
 Goh Yihan
 Goi Rui Xuan
 Gold 905
 Gold Bars triple murders
 Gold Peak
 Golden Agri-Resources
 Golden Mic Awards
 Golden Mic Awards 2016
 Golden Mile Complex
 Golden Village
 Golf at the 2015 Southeast Asian Games
 Gombak United FC
 Gone Shopping
 Gong Li
 Gong Qianyun
 Gonna Make It (TV series)
 Gonyosoma margaritatum
 Gonyosoma oxycephalum
 Good Friday
 Good Luck (TV series)
 Goodbye & Hello (Tanya Chua album)
 Goods and Services Tax (Singapore)
 Goodwood Park Hotel
 Google.com.sg
 Gopal Baratham
 Gopinath Pillai
 Goran Grubesic
 Goran Ljubojević
 Goran Paulić
 Goran Šubara
 Gordon Bennett (general)
 Gordon Jockel
 Gordon Snell
 Gordon Tang
 Got to Believe
 Government Technology Agency
 Government of Singapore
 Govindasamy Suppiah
 Grab (company)
 Grace Assembly of God
 Grace Chia
 Grace Ciao
 Grace Fu
 Graduate diploma
 Grain (company)
 Grant Barlow
 Grant Holt
 Graphium agamemnon
 Graphium antiphates
 Graphium doson
 Graphium sarpedon
 Grass jelly
 Great Britain at the 2010 Summer Youth Olympics
 Great Eastern Life
 Great Pretender (TV series)
 Great Singapore Sale
 Great Wall Airlines
 Great Wheel Corporation
 Great World Amusement Park
 Great World MRT station
 Great World, Singapore
 Greater Southern Waterfront
 Greater bamboo bat
 Greater mouse-deer
 Greater scissortail
 Greece at the 2010 Summer Youth Olympics
 Greedy Ghost
 Green envelope
 Greendale Secondary School
 Greenridge Secondary School
 Greg Nwokolo
 Gregory S. Chirikjian
 Gregory Yong
 Grenada at the 2010 Summer Youth Olympics
 Griselda Khng
 Grisse
 Groom My Room
 Group 90
 Group representation constituency
 Growing Up (Singaporean TV series)
 Grown Up (album)
 Gu Hongming
 Gu Juan
 Guam at the 2010 Summer Youth Olympics
 Guan Kee Fried Kway Teow
 Guangyang Secondary School
 Guards (Singapore Army)
 Guatemala at the 2010 Summer Youth Olympics
 Guiga Lyes Ben Laroussi
 Guilin, Singapore
 Guillaume Kavaruganda
 Guinea at the 2010 Summer Youth Olympics
 Guinea-Bissau at the 2010 Summer Youth Olympics
 Gul Circle
 Gul Circle MRT station
 Gulai
 Guntur Djafril
 Guo Jun
 Guo Liang (actor)
 Guo Wei (footballer)
 Guoco Tower
 Gurcharan Singh Sekhon
 Gurkha Contingent
 Gurkha Contingent Pipes and Drums Platoon
 Gurmit Singh
 Gurushetram – 24 Hours of Anger
 Gushcloud International
 Gusta Guzarishah
 Guyana at the 2010 Summer Youth Olympics
 Gwee Li Sui
 Gwendoline Yeo
 Gymkhana FC
 Gymnastics at the 2010 Summer Youth Olympics
 Gymnastics at the 2010 Summer Youth Olympics – Men's artistic individual all-around
 Gymnastics at the 2010 Summer Youth Olympics – Men's artistic qualification
 Gymnastics at the 2010 Summer Youth Olympics – Men's floor
 Gymnastics at the 2010 Summer Youth Olympics – Men's horizontal bar
 Gymnastics at the 2010 Summer Youth Olympics – Men's parallel bars
 Gymnastics at the 2010 Summer Youth Olympics – Men's pommel horse
 Gymnastics at the 2010 Summer Youth Olympics – Men's rings
 Gymnastics at the 2010 Summer Youth Olympics – Men's trampoline
 Gymnastics at the 2010 Summer Youth Olympics – Men's vault
 Gymnastics at the 2010 Summer Youth Olympics – Women's artistic individual all-around
 Gymnastics at the 2010 Summer Youth Olympics – Women's artistic qualification
 Gymnastics at the 2010 Summer Youth Olympics – Women's balance beam
 Gymnastics at the 2010 Summer Youth Olympics – Women's floor
 Gymnastics at the 2010 Summer Youth Olympics – Women's rhythmic group all-around
 Gymnastics at the 2010 Summer Youth Olympics – Women's rhythmic individual all-around
 Gymnastics at the 2010 Summer Youth Olympics – Women's trampoline
 Gymnastics at the 2010 Summer Youth Olympics – Women's uneven bars
 Gymnastics at the 2010 Summer Youth Olympics – Women's vault
 Gymnastics at the 2015 Southeast Asian Games
 Gymnastics at the 2015 Southeast Asian Games – Men's artistic individual all-around
 Gymnastics at the 2015 Southeast Asian Games – Men's artistic team
 Gymnastics at the 2015 Southeast Asian Games – Men's floor
 Gymnastics at the 2015 Southeast Asian Games – Men's horizontal bar
 Gymnastics at the 2015 Southeast Asian Games – Men's parallel bars
 Gymnastics at the 2015 Southeast Asian Games – Men's pommel horse
 Gymnastics at the 2015 Southeast Asian Games – Men's rings
 Gymnastics at the 2015 Southeast Asian Games – Men's vault
 Gymnastics at the 2015 Southeast Asian Games – Women's artistic individual all-around
 Gymnastics at the 2015 Southeast Asian Games – Women's artistic team
 Gymnastics at the 2015 Southeast Asian Games – Women's balance beam
 Gymnastics at the 2015 Southeast Asian Games – Women's floor
 Gymnastics at the 2015 Southeast Asian Games – Women's rhythmic group all-around
 Gymnastics at the 2015 Southeast Asian Games – Women's rhythmic individual all-around
 Gymnastics at the 2015 Southeast Asian Games – Women's uneven bars
 Gymnastics at the 2015 Southeast Asian Games – Women's vault

H

 H. C. Matthew Sim
 HBO Asia
 HBO Family (Asian TV channel)
 HBO Hits
 HBO Signature (Asian TV channel)
 HD5 (Singaporean TV channel)
 HDB Hub
 HMS Prince of Wales (53)
 HMS Repulse (1916)
 HMS Waterwitch (1892)
 HRnetGroup
 HSBC Women's Champions
 HSwMS Hälsingland (Hgd)
 HSwMS Sjöbjörnen (Sbj)
 HSwMS Sjöhunden (Shu)
 HSwMS Sjöhästen (Shä)
 HSwMS Sjölejonet (Sle)
 HSwMS Sjöormen (Sor)
 HSwMS Södermanland (Söd)
 HSwMS Västergötland (Vgd)
 HTMS Angthong
 HaMerotz LaMillion 2
 Haato
 HackerspaceSG
 Hadama Bathily
 Hadiputradila Saswadimata
 Hady Mirza
 Hafiz Abu Sujad
 Hafiz Nor
 Hafiz Osman
 Hafiz Rahim
 Hagai Dikan
 Hague Agreement Concerning the International Deposit of Industrial Designs
 Hague Choice of Court Convention
 Hague Convention on the Civil Aspects of International Child Abduction
 Hague Conventions of 1899 and 1907
 Hague Evidence Convention
 Hague Hijacking Convention
 Hague Protocol
 Hague–Visby Rules
 Hai Inn Temple
 Hai San Secret Society
 Hai Sing Catholic School
 Haikal Hasnol
 Hainan Kopi Tales
 Hainanese chicken rice
 Hainanese curry rice
 Haiqal Pashia
 Hair for Hope
 Hairi Su'ap
 Hairul Syirhan
 Haiti at the 2010 Summer Youth Olympics
 Haizhou Li
 Hajar Ali
 Hajdar Muneka
 Haji Lane
 Hakka Chinese
 Halimah Yacob
 Halogen Foundation
 Ham Hyeong-kyu
 Ham chim peng
 Hamed Koné
 Hami Syahin
 Hamid Berguiga
 Hamid Estili
 Hamizan Hisham
 Hamkah Afik
 Han Lao Da
 Han Sai Por
 Han Suyin
 Han Yiguang
 HanKore Environment Tech Group
 Hanafi Akbar
 Hanafi Ghazali
 Hancock Thomas Haughton
 Hand in Hand (Singaporean TV series)
 Handa Singapore Classic
 Handball Federation Singapore
 Handball at the 2010 Summer Youth Olympics
 Handball at the 2010 Summer Youth Olympics – Boys' tournament
 Handball at the 2010 Summer Youth Olympics – Girls' tournament
 Handong Sun
 Hang Lung Bank
 Hang Tuah (film)
 Hanli Hoefer
 Hannah Whelan
 Hans Hermann Eschke
 Hans Larive
 Hany Soh
 Happily Ever After (2007 TV series)
 Happy Can Already!
 Happy Can Already! 2
 Happy Can Already! 3
 Happy Can Already! 4
 Happy Family (Singaporean TV series)
 Har cheong gai
 HarbourFront (Singapore)
 HarbourFront Bus Interchange
 HarbourFront Centre
 HarbourFront MRT station
 Hard Rock Cafe
 HardwareZone
 Haresh Sharma
 Harhys Stewart
 Hari McCoy
 Hari Raya songs
 Harimau Muda
 Harimau Muda A
 Harimau Muda B
 Hariss Harun
 Harith Kanadi
 Harith Lim
 Hariysh Krishnakumar
 Harold Ball
 Haron Amin
 Harrison Hoist
 Harrison Muranda
 Harry Birtwistle
 Harry E. T. Thayer
 Harry Elias
 Harry Mutuma Kathurima
 Harry Ord
 Hartal
 Haruki Seto
 Harun Salim Bachik
 Harun Thohir
 Hasora badra
 Hasora chromus
 Hasora schoenherr
 Hasora taminatus
 Hasora vitta
 Hassan Sunny
 Hassanal Bolkiah
 Hassanal Bolkiah National Stadium
 Haunted Changi
 Have a Little Faith (TV series)
 Havelock Constituency
 Havelock MRT station
 Haven (JJ Lin album)
 Haven Inc.
 Haw Par Corporation
 Haw Par Villa
 Haw Par Villa MRT station
 Hawker centre
 Hay Group Global R&D Center for Strategy Execution
 Hayden Allen
 Hayden Ng
 Hayes Marriott
 Hayley Woo
 Hazali Nasiron
 Hazel Kaneswaran
 Hazel Poa
 Hazim Faiz
 Hazlina Abdul Halim
 Hazzuwan Halim
 He Shuming
 He Ting Ru
 He Ying Ying
 Health Promotion Board
 Health Sciences Authority
 Health in Singapore
 Healthcare in Singapore
 Heap Eng Moh Steamship Co
 Hear Me Out (TV series)
 Heart of God Church
 Heartland (Shiau novel)
 Heartland Mall
 Heartlanders
 Heather Chasen
 Hebomoia glaucippe
 Hector Mitchell
 Hedwig Anuar
 Heeren Building
 Hegen
 Heineken Asia Pacific
 Heinrich von Pierer
 Hekka
 Helen Heng
 Helena Wong (weightlifter)
 Helicap
 Helix Bridge
 Hello Singapore
 Helmut Panke
 Helvia
 Hemidactylus craspedotus
 Henderson Constituency
 Henderson Hill, Singapore
 Henderson Secondary School
 Henderson Waves
 Hendra Wijaya (badminton)
 Hendri Saputra
 Heng Chee How
 Heng Kim Song
 Heng Siok Tian
 Heng Swee Keat
 Henn Tan
 Henrich R. Greve
 Henry Baines (bishop)
 Henry Kwek
 Henry Meyners Bernard
 Henry Nicholas Ridley
 Henry Ong
 Henry Pownall
 Henry Thia
 Heok Hee Ng
 Heok Hui Tan
 Her Many Faces
 Her World
 Herbert Cecil Duncan
 Here (2009 film)
 Here's a Million
 Heritage trees in Singapore
 Hero (2016 TV series)
 Hero of the Times
 Heroes in Black
 Heteropoda davidbowie
 Hetty Sarlene
 Hey Gorgeous
 Hey Gorgeous (season 3)
 Hicham Bouchemlal
 Hidetoshi Wakui
 Hidhir Hasbiallah
 Hierodula membranacea
 High Commission of Canada, Singapore
 High Commission of Singapore, London
 High Court of Singapore
 High Flyers (Singaporean TV series)
 High-definition television in Singapore
 Hijjas Kasturi
 Hikaru Mizuno
 Hikayat Abdullah
 Hill Dickinson
 Hill Street Tai Hwa Pork Noodle
 Hill Street, Singapore
 Hillgrove Secondary School
 Hillhouse Capital Group
 Hillside World Academy
 Hillview MRT station
 Hillview, Singapore
 Hilman Norhisam
 Hilton Singapore Orchard
 Hin Leong
 Hindhede Nature Park
 Hindu Endowments Board
 Hinduism in Singapore
 Hiroaki Hiraoka (footballer)
 Hiroki Morisaki
 Hiromasa Yonekura
 Hiroshi Abe (war criminal)
 Hiroshi Kichise
 Hiroshi Ohashi
 Hirotaka Usui
 Hiroyoshi Kamata
 Hiroyuki Ishida
 Hiroyuki Yamamoto (footballer)
 History of Asian art
 History of Changi Airport
 History of Singapore
 History of Singapore Airlines
 History of Singapore General Hospital
 History of Singaporean Indians
 History of the Jews in Singapore
 History of the MRT (Singapore)
 History of the Republic of Singapore
 History of the Singapore Police Force
 Hitachi small-type monorail (Sentosa Express)
 Hitman in the City
 Ho Ching
 Ho Geok Choo
 Ho Ho Ying
 Ho Kah Leong
 Ho Kun Xian
 Ho Kwon Ping
 Ho Lien Siew
 Ho Lye Toh
 Ho Peng Kee
 Ho Tzu Nyen
 Ho Wai Loon
 Ho Yen Chye
 Ho Yeow Sun
 Ho Yuen Hoe
 Hoaxes in Singapore
 Hobart Baumann Amstutz
 Hock Lee bus riots
 Hodlnaut
 Hoi Kim Heng
 Hokkien
 Hokkien influence on Singaporean Mandarin
 Hokkien mee
 Holidays with Pay (Agriculture) Convention, 1952
 Holland Road railway station
 Holland Road, Singapore
 Holland V (TV series)
 Holland Village MRT station
 Holland Village, Singapore
 Holland–Bukit Panjang Group Representation Constituency
 Holland–Bukit Timah Group Representation Constituency
 Holy Innocents' High School
 Holy Trinity Anglican Church (Singapore)
 Home (Kit Chan song)
 Home Improvement Programme
 Home Team Academy
 Home Team Science and Technology Agency
 Home Team Volunteers Network
 Home Truly
 Home in Toa Payoh
 Homecoming (2011 film)
 Homeplus
 Homerun (film)
 Hon Sui Sen
 Honduras at the 2010 Summer Youth Olympics
 Honestbee
 Hong Choon
 Hong Huifang
 Hong Junyang
 Hong Kah
 Hong Kah Constituency
 Hong Kah Group Representation Constituency
 Hong Kah MRT station
 Hong Kah North Single Member Constituency
 Hong Kah Secondary School
 Hong Kong Soya Sauce Chicken Rice and Noodle
 Hong Kong at the 2010 Summer Youth Olympics
 Hong Kong national security law
 Hong Kong–Singapore relations
 Hong Lam Marine
 Hong Leong Building
 Hong Lim Constituency
 Hong Lim Park
 Hong Ling (actress)
 Hong San See
 Hong Wei Jian
 Hongkong Land
 Honorary Citizen of Singapore
 Honour and Passion
 Hoo Ah Kay
 Hoo Cher Mou
 Hooq
 Hoover Theatre
 Hopea mengarawan
 Hopea pedicellata
 Horaga syrinx
 Horizon Fuel Cell Technologies
 Horsburgh Lighthouse
 Horsfieldia superba
 HortPark
 Hossan Leong
 Hostages Convention
 Hotel Fort Canning
 Hougang
 Hougang Bus Depot
 Hougang Central Bus Interchange
 Hougang MRT station
 Hougang Mall
 Hougang Secondary School
 Hougang Single Member Constituency
 Hougang Stadium
 Hougang United FC
 House of Fortune
 House of Harmony
 House of Joy
 House of Tan Yeok Nee
 Housewives' Holiday
 Housing and Development Board
 How Are You? (TV series)
 How We Disappeared
 Howard Newton (engineer)
 Howe Yoon Chong
 Hri Kumar Nair
 Hrvoje Matkovic (soccer)
 Hsieh Fa-dah
 Hsu Li Yang
 Hua Giam Si
 Hua Yi Secondary School
 Huan Liu
 Huang Biren
 Huang Chao (badminton)
 Huang Jianli
 Huang Jing (academic)
 Huang Jun (footballer)
 Huang Junxiang
 Huang Po Ju
 Huang Qing Yuan
 Huang Wenyong
 Huang Yiliang
 Huasing Association
 Hub Drama First
 Hub E City
 Hub Sports Arena
 Hub VV Drama
 HubbaBubbas
 Hubert Ng
 Hugh Clifford
 Hugh Cruttwell
 Hugh Fraser (colonial administrator)
 Human Capital (magazine)
 Human rights in Singapore
 Human trafficking in Singapore
 Humanist Society (Singapore)
 Humanitarian Organization for Migration Economics
 Hume MRT station
 Humpback Oak
 Hundred Days (album)
 Hungary at the 2010 Summer Youth Olympics
 Hunter AFV
 Hunter Wade
 Hurricane (clipper)
 Hussein Akil
 Hussein Aljunied
 Hussein Shah of Johor
 Hutchison Port Holdings
 Huzaifah Aziz
 Huzir Sulaiman
 Hwa Chong
 Hwa Chong Institution
 Hwa Chong Institution Boarding School
 Hwa Chong International School
 Hwa Chong Junior College
 Hwee Hwee Tan
 Hyarotis adrastus
 Hydrophis gracilis
 Hydrophis peronii
 Hyflux
 Hylarana glandulosa
 Hymenopus coronatus
 Hypolimnas anomala
 Hypolimnas bolina
 Hypolycaena erylus
 Hypolycaena thecloides
 Hyrulnizam Juma'at
 Hyundai Rotem CJ151
 Håkan Söderstjerna

I

 I Am David Sparkle
 I Believe (film)
 I Do, I Do (film)
 I Gede Ngurah Swajaya
 I Light Marina Bay
 I Live Alone (album)
 I Not Stupid
 I Not Stupid Too
 I Not Stupid Too (TV series)
 I Want to Go Home (2017 film)
 I'm in Charge
 I, Human
 I-Weilian
 I12 Katong
 I2i
 IB Schools in Singapore
 ICELL Network
 ICMS Singapore
 ICONZ
 IDA International
 IGG Inc.
 IHH Healthcare
 IM Flash Singapore
 IMM (Singapore)
 INA treasure controversy
 INRI studio
 INSEAD
 INo Mobile
 ION Orchard
 IProperty Group
 ISEAS–Yusof Ishak Institute
 ISO 3166-2:SG
 ISS International School
 ITE College Central
 ITE College Central murder
 ITE College East
 ITE College West
 Iambrix salsala
 Ian Ang
 Ian Fang
 Ian Goodenough
 Ian Gore
 Ian MacAlister Stewart
 Ian McEwan
 Ibrahim Nasir
 Ibrahim Yaacob
 Ibrahim of Johor
 Ibu Mertua-ku
 Ibuki Inoue
 Iceland at the 2010 Summer Youth Olympics
 Ichiro Otsuka
 Ichthyophis paucisulcus
 Ichthyophis singaporensis
 Idastrandia
 Idea stolli
 Ideopsis vulgaris
 Idiyappam
 Idraki Adnan
 If Only I Could (TV series)
 If We Dream Too Long
 Ifwat Ismail
 Iggy's
 Ignatius Ang
 Ignatius Leong
 Igor Ferreira
 Igor Čerina
 Ikhsan Fandi
 Ikuma Osaka
 Ilan Ben-Dov (diplomat)
 Ilhan Fandi
 Ilhan Noor
 Ilian Mihov
 Illegal immigration to Singapore
 Illegality in Singapore administrative law
 Illyas Lee
 Ilo Ilo
 Images of Singapore
 Iman Hakim
 Imbiah Lookout
 Immigration and Checkpoints Authority
 Immigration to Singapore
 Imperfect (2012 film)
 Impiety (band)
 Imram bin Mohamed
 Imran Sahib
 In Conversation (Singaporean TV program)
 In Love with You
 In My Mother's Skin
 In Pursuit of Peace
 In a Heartbeat (Sylvia Ratonel song)
 In the Heart of the World
 In the Name of Love (TV series)
 In the Room (film)
 Inch Chua
 Income Insurance
 Income Tax Act 1947
 Income tax in Singapore
 Incredible Tales
 Independence of Singapore Agreement 1965
 Independence-class littoral mission vessel
 Independence-class patrol craft
 Inderjit Singh (Singaporean politician)
 India at the 2010 Summer Youth Olympics
 Indian Association Ground
 Indian Heritage Centre
 Indian Independence League
 Indian National Army
 Indian National Army in Singapore
 Indian National Army in popular culture
 Indian Singaporean cuisine
 Indian Singaporeans
 Indian field hockey team in Malaya and Singapore
 India–Singapore Comprehensive Economic Cooperation Agreement
 India–Singapore relations
 IndigNation
 Individual physical proficiency test
 Indofood Agri Resources
 Indonesia 13–1 Philippines
 Indonesia AirAsia Flight 8501
 Indonesia at the 2009 Asian Youth Games
 Indonesia at the 2010 Summer Youth Olympics
 Indonesia at the 2015 Southeast Asian Games
 Indonesia–Malaysia confrontation
 Indonesia–Malaysia–Singapore growth triangle
 Indonesia–Singapore border
 Indonesia–Singapore relations
 Indorama Corporation
 Indra Sahdan Daud
 Indra Wijaya
 Indranee Nadisen
 Indranee Rajah
 Infantry (Singapore Army)
 Infocomm Clubs Programme
 Infocomm Media Development Authority
 Information Technology Agreement
 Infrastructure of Changi Airport
 Ingerophrynus quadriporcatus
 Inheritance tax
 Initium Media
 Injustice (Malaysian TV series)
 Inland Revenue Authority of Singapore
 Innocence Lost (TV series)
 Innova Junior College
 Innovation (magazine)
 Innovia APM 100
 Inside Maximum Security
 Insolvency and Public Trustee's Office
 Inspector Singh Investigates
 InstantTV
 Instarem
 Institute for Adult Learning
 Institute for Defence and Strategic Studies
 Institute for Mathematical Sciences
 Institute of Contemporary Arts Singapore
 Institute of Mental Health (Singapore)
 Institute of Policy Studies (Singapore)
 Institute of Singapore Chartered Accountants
 Institute of Systems Science
 Institute of Technical Education
 Intan Azura Mokhtar
 Integrated Electronic Litigation System
 Integrated Health Information Systems
 Integrated Programme
 Integrated Train Testing Centre
 Integrated resort
 Intellectual Property Office of Singapore
 Intelligent Nation 2015
 Inter-racial and religious confidence circle
 InterContinental Singapore Robertson Quay
 Interactive & Digital Media Centre
 Intercultural Theatre Institute
 Internal Security Act (Singapore)
 Internal Security Department (Singapore)
 Internal Shuttle Bus
 International (Nice) Classification of Goods and Services
 International Agreement for the suppression of the White Slave Traffic
 International Air Services Transit Agreement
 International Business Park
 International Convention Against Doping in Sport
 International Convention for the Protection of New Varieties of Plants
 International Convention for the Suppression of Counterfeiting Currency
 International Convention for the Suppression of the Traffic in Women and Children
 International Convention for the Suppression of the Traffic in Women of Full Age
 International Convention on Civil Liability for Bunker Oil Pollution Damage
 International Convention on Civil Liability for Oil Pollution Damage
 International Convention on Load Lines
 International Convention on Maritime Search and Rescue
 International Convention on Oil Pollution Preparedness, Response and Co-operation
 International Convention on the Control of Harmful Anti-fouling Systems on Ships
 International Convention on the Elimination of All Forms of Racial Discrimination
 International Convention on the Establishment of an International Fund for Compensation for Oil Pollution Damage
 International Convention on the Harmonized Commodity Description and Coding System
 International Convention to Facilitate the Importation of Commercial Samples and Advertising Material
 International Enterprise Singapore
 International French School (Singapore)
 International Journal of Information Technology & Decision Making
 International Medical University
 International Plant Protection Convention
 International Plaza (Singapore)
 International Regulations for Preventing Collisions at Sea
 International Series (golf)
 International Treaty on Plant Genetic Resources for Food and Agriculture
 International Union of Pure and Applied Physics
 International rankings of Singapore
 International reactions to the 2018 North Korea–United States summit
 Internet censorship in Singapore
 Internet in Singapore
 Intouch Holdings
 Inuka
 Invictus International School
 Inéquilibre
 Iqbal Hussain
 Iqram Rifqi
 Iran at the 2009 Asian Youth Games
 Iran at the 2010 Summer Youth Olympics
 Iraota rochana
 Iraq War
 Iraq at the 2010 Summer Youth Olympics
 Iraq–Singapore relations
 Ireland at the 2010 Summer Youth Olympics
 Irene Clennell case
 Irene Ng (politician)
 Irfan Fandi
 Irfan Najeeb
 Iris Koh
 Irreligion in Singapore
 Iruvar (TV series)
 Irwan Shah
 Isa Halim
 Isabelle Li
 Isac Doru
 Isetan
 Iskandar Ismail
 Iskandar Jalil
 Iskandar Puteri
 Iskandar Shah
 Islam in Singapore
 Island in the Centre
 Ismadi Mukhtar
 Ismail Haron
 Ismail Marjan
 Ismail Yunos
 Ismaël Benahmed
 Israel Eliashiv
 Israel at the 2010 Summer Youth Olympics
 Israel–Singapore relations
 Issey Nakajima-Farran
 Istana
 Istana Bidadari
 Istana Kampong Glam
 Istana Lama
 Istana Park
 Istana Tyersall
 Istana Woodneuk
 It Takes Two (Singaporean TV series)
 It's Time (Stefanie Sun album)
 It's a Great, Great World
 It's a Wonderful Life (TV series)
 Italy at the 2010 Summer Youth Olympics
 Itamar Rangel
 Ithu Namma Veedu
 Itimi Dickson
 Itimi Wilson
 Itsuki Yamada
 Ivan Heng
 Ivan Jakov Džoni
 Ivan Jerković
 Ivan Kelic
 Ivan Lovrić (footballer)
 Ivan Lyon
 Ivan Png
 Ivica Raguž
 Ivor Gillett
 Ivory Coast at the 2010 Summer Youth Olympics
 Ivy Lee (actress)
 Ivy Singh-Lim
 Ivy Tan
 Iván Asenjo
 Iwuchukwu Amara Tochi
 Ix Shen
 Izwan Mahbud
 Izzdin Shafiq

J

 J C Sum
 J. B. Jeyaretnam
 J. Dhukilan
 J. M. J. Supramaniam
 J. Y. Pillay
 J.CO Donuts
 J1 World Tour
 JCube
 JJ Lin
 JJ Lin discography
 JPMorgan Corporate Challenge
 JSSL Singapore
 JTC Corporation
 Jacelyn Tay
 Jacen Tan
 Jacintha Abisheganaden
 Jack Chamberlain (sportsman)
 Jack Edwards (British Army soldier)
 Jack Neo
 Jack Sim
 Jack Snowden
 Jack's Place (restaurant)
 Jackie Yi-Ru Ying
 Jacksen F. Tiago
 Jackson Plan
 Jackson Rathbone
 Jacob Ballas Children's Garden
 Jacob Mahler
 Jade Rasif
 Jade Seah
 Jade String Quartet
 Jae Ang
 Jae Liew
 Jahan Loh
 Jainism in Singapore
 Jake Butler
 Jalal Talebi
 Jalan Ahmad Ibrahim
 Jalan Ampas
 Jalan Bahar
 Jalan Benaan Kapal
 Jalan Besar
 Jalan Besar Constituency
 Jalan Besar Group Representation Constituency
 Jalan Besar MRT station
 Jalan Besar Stadium
 Jalan Boon Lay
 Jalan Bukit Merah, Singapore
 Jalan Buroh
 Jalan Kayu
 Jalan Kayu Constituency
 Jalan Kubor Cemetery
 Jamaica at the 2010 Summer Youth Olympics
 Jameel McKay
 James Cook University Singapore
 James Cooke (sailor)
 James Crabtree
 James Curtis Hepburn
 James Gomez (politician)
 James Jack (artist)
 James Le Mesurier
 James Lee (writer)
 James Lye
 James MacRitchie
 James Phang Wah
 James Seah
 James Seng
 James W. W. Birch
 James de Beaujeu Domville
 JamiQ
 Jamides bochus
 Jamides celeno
 Jamie Pitt
 Jamie Reeves (footballer)
 Jamie Yeo
 Jamil Ali
 Jamus Lim
 Jan B. Poulsen
 Janadas Devan
 Janak Prakash
 Janani D/O Madhavan
 Jane Lee (mountaineer)
 Janet Jesudason
 Janet Lim
 Janet Yee
 Jang Hong-won
 Jang Jo-yoon
 Jang Jung
 Janice Koh
 Janice Wong
 Janil Puthucheary
 Jannie Chan
 Japan at the 2010 Summer Youth Olympics
 Japanese Cemetery Park
 Japanese Film Festival
 Japanese Garden, Singapore
 Japanese Seventh Area Army
 Japanese government-issued dollar in Malaya and Borneo
 Japanese minelayer Wakataka
 Japanese occupation of Singapore
 Japanese order of battle during the Malayan campaign
 Japanese people in Singapore
 Japan–Singapore relations
 Jardine Cycle & Carriage
 Jardine Matheson
 Jardine Strategic Holdings
 Jared Gallagher
 Jarnail Singh (physician)
 Jarrell Huang
 Jaslee Hatta
 Jasmine Lowson
 Jasmine Ng
 Jasmine Ser
 Jasmine Sim
 Jasmine Sokko
 Jasmine Yeong-Nathan
 Jason Ainsley
 Jason Batty
 Jason Chang
 Jason Chee
 Jason Goh Koon-Jong
 Jason Keng-Kwin Chan
 Jason Teh
 Jason White (footballer, born 1971)
 Jason Withe
 Jasper Chan
 Jasper Johns (footballer)
 Jaspers Lai
 Java pipistrelle
 Javan myna
 Javanese people
 Jawi Peranakan
 Jaya Rathakrishnan
 Jayathri Samarakone
 Jayley Woo
 Jaynesh Isuran
 Jazreel Tan
 Jean Chong
 Jean Danker
 Jean Tay
 Jean Yip Group
 Jean-Baptiste Boucho
 Jean-Charles Blanpin
 Jean-Christophe Öberg
 Jean-Francois Manzoni
 Jean-Jacques Subrenat
 Jean-Marc Audemar
 Jean-Marie Beurel
 Jeanette Aw
 Jeannette Chong-Aruldoss
 Jebsen & Jessen (SEA)
 Jee Leong Koh
 Jeevaneesh Soundararajah
 Jeff Wang
 Jeffrey Pinsler
 Jeffrey Xu
 Jefri Bolkiah, Prince of Brunei
 Jek Yeun Thong
 Jelapang LRT station
 Jem, Singapore
 Jemaah Islamiyah
 Jemput-jemput
 Jennie Chua
 Jennifer Tham
 Jenny Lau Buong Bee
 Jenny Lee (venture capitalist)
 Jens Kjell Otterbech
 Jeon Bong-seong
 Jeon Byung-guk
 Jeon Kyung-jun
 Jeon Woo-keun
 Jeremiah Choy
 Jeremy Bagshaw
 Jeremy Chan
 Jeremy Chiang
 Jeremy Kench
 Jeremy Koh
 Jeremy Liew
 Jeremy Monteiro
 Jeremy Tiang
 Jermaine Leong
 Jermaine Pennant
 Jeroen van der Veer
 Jerome Baker (soccer)
 Jerome Henderson (Singaporean basketball player)
 Jerrold Yam
 Jerry Yeo
 Jesseca Liu
 Jessica Gomes
 Jessica Henwick
 Jessica Martin
 Jessica Tan
 Jessica Tan (badminton)
 Jeszlene Zhou
 Jet Li
 Jet Ng
 Jetstar Asia Airways
 Jett8 Airlines
 Jewel Changi Airport
 Jewel of Muscat
 Jewellery Design and Management International School
 Jia Le Channel
 Jiak Chuan Road
 Jiak Kim Bridge
 Jian Xin
 Jian Xin Xu
 JianHao Tan
 Jiang Tao (footballer, born 1985)
 Jiang Tao (footballer, born 1989)
 Jiang Yanmei
 Jiang Yanyong
 Jill Lim
 Jill McIntosh
 Jill Quek
 Jim Rogers
 Jim Shoulder
 Jim Weir (diplomat)
 Jimami Tofu
 Jimmy Nah
 Jimmy Taenaka
 Jimmy Ye
 Jin Long Si Temple
 Jin Yinji
 Jin Yujia
 Jing Junhong
 Jing's Note
 Jing-Jing Lee
 Jinrikisha Station
 Jo Heng
 Joan Pereira
 Joan Poh
 Joan Rose
 Joanna Dong
 Joanna Toh
 Joanna Wong Quee Heng
 Joanne Ooi
 Joanne Peh
 Joaquin Lopez (Argentine footballer)
 Jocelyn Chng Yee Kwang
 Jocie Guo
 Joe Gamble
 Joe Russell (tennis)
 Joel Chan (photographer)
 Joel Chew
 Joel Sng
 Joel Tan
 Joel Western
 Joey Sim
 Johann Georg Bausum
 Johannes van Damme
 Johannesburg Institute for Advanced Study
 John Anderson (colonial administrator)
 John Bennet (archaeologist)
 John Burton-Race
 John Buttery
 John Cheng
 John Chew
 John Chuang (Singaporean businessman)
 John Clang
 John Crawfurd
 John David Morley
 John Douglas (colonial administrator)
 John Drysdale (historian)
 John Dykes
 John Fearns Nicoll
 John Frederick Dickson
 John Gemmill
 John H. Holdridge
 John J. Voll
 John Klass
 John Laycock
 John Leonard Harrison
 John Little (department store)
 John Macphail (rugby union)
 John Martin Scripps
 John N. Miksic
 John Nicholson (author)
 John O'Reilly (engineer)
 John Quinn (diplomat)
 John Scott (colonial administrator)
 John Tremayne Babington
 John Turnbull Thomson
 John Vernon Rob
 John Wilkinson (footballer, born 1979)
 John Yap
 Johnnie Walker Classic
 Johnny Lau
 Johnston's Pier
 Johor Bahru
 Johor Bahru Sentral station
 Johor Bahru–Singapore Rapid Transit System
 Johora singaporensis
 Johore Battery
 Johor–Singapore Causeway
 Joi Chua
 Jolovan Wham
 Jon Foo
 Jon Huntsman Jr.
 Jonathan Béhé
 Jonathan Chan
 Jonathan Chua
 Jonathan E. Kaplan
 Jonathan Justin
 Jonathan Leong
 Jonathan Seet
 Jonathan Tan (footballer)
 Jonathan Tan (swimmer)
 Jonathan Toto
 Jonathan Xu
 Joo Chiat Road
 Joo Chiat Single Member Constituency
 Joo Ki-hwan
 Joo Koon
 Joo Koon Bus Interchange
 Joo Koon MRT station
 Joo Koon rail accident
 Joo Seng
 Jordan Chan (footballer)
 Jordan Emaviwe
 Jordan Vestering
 Jordan Webb
 Jordan at the 2010 Summer Youth Olympics
 Jorgen Nielsen (football manager)
 Joscelin Yeo
 Joseph Grimberg
 Joseph McNally (brother)
 Joseph Prince
 Joseph Schooling
 Joseph Taylor (footballer, born 1996)
 Josephine Teo
 Josephus Tan
 Josh Urbiztondo
 Joshua Ang
 Joshua Ip
 Joshua Pereira
 Joshua Simon (radio presenter)
 Joshua Tan
 Journal of Advanced Manufacturing Systems
 Journal of Information & Knowledge Management
 Journal of Southeast Asian Studies
 Journal of the Malaysian Branch of the Royal Asiatic Society
 Jovina Choo
 Jovina Tseng
 Jowen Lim
 Joyce Beetuan Koh
 Joyce Chu
 Joys of Life
 Jozef Kapláň
 João Moreira (footballer, born 1986)
 Joël Tshibamba
 Joško Španjić
 Juan Rodríguez Rubio
 Jubilee Bridge, Singapore
 Judge of Singapore (disambiguation)
 Judgement Day (2013 film)
 Judicial independence in Singapore
 Judicial officers of the Republic of Singapore
 Judicial system of Singapore
 Judith Prakash
 Judo at the 1973 Southeast Asian Peninsular Games
 Judo at the 1983 Southeast Asian Games
 Judo at the 2010 Summer Youth Olympics
 Judo at the 2010 Summer Youth Olympics – Boys' 100 kg
 Judo at the 2010 Summer Youth Olympics – Boys' 55 kg
 Judo at the 2010 Summer Youth Olympics – Boys' 66 kg
 Judo at the 2010 Summer Youth Olympics – Boys' 81 kg
 Judo at the 2010 Summer Youth Olympics – Girls' 44 kg
 Judo at the 2010 Summer Youth Olympics – Girls' 52 kg
 Judo at the 2010 Summer Youth Olympics – Girls' 63 kg
 Judo at the 2010 Summer Youth Olympics – Girls' 78 kg
 Judo at the 2010 Summer Youth Olympics – Mixed team
 Judo at the 2015 Southeast Asian Games
 Jufri Taha
 Jufrie Mahmood
 Julia Levy
 Julia Nickson
 Julian Hee
 Julian Wright (economist)
 Juliana Yasin
 Julie Tan
 Julie Tan (activist)
 Julien Delétraz
 Julien Durand (footballer)
 Julio Cid
 Julio César Moreno
 Juma'at Jantan
 Jumbo Seafood
 Jump! (TV series)
 Jun Kobayashi
 Junction 10
 Junction 8
 Junda Chen
 June Yap
 Jung Hee-bong
 Junie Sng
 Juninho (footballer, born 1979)
 Junior college (Singapore)
 Junki Kenn Yoshimura
 Junonia almana
 Junonia atlites
 Junonia hedonia
 Junonia orithya
 Junpei Yamada
 Junyuan Secondary School
 Jurassic Park Rapids Adventure
 Jurisdictional error
 Jurisdictional fact
 Jurong
 Jurong Bird Park
 Jurong Bird Park Panorail
 Jurong Central Park
 Jurong Community Hospital
 Jurong East
 Jurong East Bus Interchange
 Jurong East MRT station
 Jurong East Stadium
 Jurong Entertainment Centre
 Jurong FC
 Jurong Formation
 Jurong Group Representation Constituency
 Jurong Health Connect
 Jurong Hill
 Jurong Hill MRT station
 Jurong Island
 Jurong Island Highway
 Jurong Island desalination plant
 Jurong Junior College
 Jurong Lake
 Jurong Lake District
 Jurong Lake District MRT station
 Jurong Pier MRT station
 Jurong Pioneer Junior College
 Jurong Point
 Jurong Police Division
 Jurong Port
 Jurong Region MRT line
 Jurong Regional Library
 Jurong Reptile Park
 Jurong Road
 Jurong Rock Caverns
 Jurong Secondary School
 Jurong Single Member Constituency
 Jurong Stadium
 Jurong Technologies Industrial
 Jurong Town Hall
 Jurong Town Hall MRT station
 Jurong Town Hall Road
 Jurong West
 Jurong West Central
 Jurong West MRT station
 Jurong West Public Library
 Jurong West Sports and Recreation Centre
 Jurong West Stadium
 Jurong railway line
 Jurong railway station
 Jurongville Secondary School
 Just Follow Law
 Just JJ World Tour 2006
 Just Love
 Just MeI-dle World Tour
 Just for Laughs Gags Asia
 Just in Singapore
 JustCo
 Justice in the City
 Justin Howard
 Justin Hui
 Justin Liu
 Justin Pasfield
 Justin Quek
 Jörg Steinebrunner
 Jürgen Raab

K

 K-Plus
 K. B. Singh
 K. K. Seet
 K. Kannan
 K. Rajagopal (director)
 K. S. Rajah
 K. Sankaran Nair
 K. Sathiaraj
 K. Shanmugam
 K. Thanaletchimi
 KF Seetoh
 KK Women's and Children's Hospital
 KOP Limited
 Kadaloor LRT station
 Kadir Yahaya
 Kaira Gong
 Kaishu Yamazaki
 Kaki Bukit Constituency
 Kaki Bukit MRT station
 Kaki Bukit SC
 Kaki Bukit Viaduct
 Kaki Bukit, Singapore
 Kallang
 Kallang Airport
 Kallang Bahru
 Kallang Basin
 Kallang Constituency
 Kallang Field
 Kallang Gasworks
 Kallang Ground
 Kallang MRT station
 Kallang Park
 Kallang River
 Kallang River body parts murder
 Kallang Riverside Park
 Kallang Road
 Kallang Roar the Movie
 Kallang Tennis Centre
 Kallang Theatre
 Kallang Wave Mall
 Kallang–Paya Lebar Expressway
 Kalwant Singh (drug trafficker)
 Kalyanam (2016 TV series)
 Kam Ning
 Kam-Neong Ma
 Kamel Chaaouane
 Kamel Ramdani
 Kamolidin Tashiyev
 Kampong Bahru Bus Terminal
 Kampong Bugis
 Kampong Chai Chee Constituency
 Kampong Glam
 Kampong Glam Group Representation Constituency
 Kampong Glam Single Member Constituency
 Kampong Java
 Kampong Kapor Constituency
 Kampong Kapor Methodist Church
 Kampong Kembangan Constituency
 Kampong Lorong Buangkok
 Kampong Ties
 Kampong Tiong Bahru
 Kampong Ubi
 Kampong Ubi Constituency
 Kampton Kam
 Kampung Admiralty
 Kamrul Ahsan
 Kan Kobayashi
 Kan Ting Chiu
 Kanagaratnam Shanmugaratnam
 Kanato Fukazawa
 Kane Ian
 Kang Cheng Xi
 Kangchu system
 Kangkar LRT station
 Kangkung (vegetable)
 Kannadi Pookal (TV series)
 Kanny Theng
 Kanwaljit Soin
 Kaos Kommand 696
 Kaplan Singapore
 Karan Singh Thakral
 Karaoke box
 Karen Tan Puay Kiow
 Karim Bencherifa
 Karim Boudjema
 Karl Hack (historian)
 Karlo Ivančić
 Karma Kagyud Buddhist Centre
 Kartina Dahari
 Karung guni
 Kasbani Kasmon
 Kate Liu
 Kate Pang
 Kate Yeo
 Katharine Brisbane
 Katherine Ng
 Kathy Feng-Yi Su
 Katong
 Katong Constituency
 Katong Park
 Katong Park MRT station
 Katong Shopping Centre
 Katong laksa
 Kavitha Anandasivam
 Kawasaki Heavy Industries & CRRC Qingdao Sifang C151C
 Kawasaki Heavy Industries & CRRC Qingdao Sifang CT251
 Kawasaki Heavy Industries & CSR Qingdao Sifang C151A
 Kawasaki Heavy Industries & CSR Qingdao Sifang C151B
 Kawasaki Heavy Industries & Nippon Sharyo C751B
 Kawasaki Heavy Industries C151
 Kay Tan
 Kaya (jam)
 Kaya toast
 Kaylani Lei
 Kazakhstan at the 2010 Summer Youth Olympics
 Kaze Teffo Etienne
 Kazeem Babatunde
 Kazuaki Yoshinaga
 Kazuki Hashioka
 Kazuki Kobayashi
 Kazuki Sakamoto
 Kazuki Sumiishi
 Kazuki Yoshino
 Kazuya Fukuzaki
 Kazuya Myodo
 Kazuyuki Toda
 Keat Hong LRT station
 Kebun Baru
 Kebun Baru Single Member Constituency
 Keegan Linderboom
 Kei Okawa
 Keiji Shigetomi
 Keisuke Matsui
 Keisuke Ogawa
 Keisuke Ota (footballer, born 1989)
 Keith Goh
 Keith Johnson (sailor)
 Keito Hariya
 Kelly & Walsh
 Kelly Chan (windsurfer)
 Kelly Poon
 Kelly Tang
 Kelong
 Kelvin Khong
 Kelvin Sng
 Kelvin Tan
 Kelvin Tan (musician)
 Kelvin Tan discography
 Kelvin Tong
 Kembangan MRT station
 Kembangan, Singapore
 Ken Chu
 Ken Ilsø
 Ken Kwek
 Ken Lim
 Ken Matsumoto
 Ken Worden
 Kenan Ragipović
 Kendrick Lee Yen Hui
 Kengo Fukudome
 Kenji Adachihara
 Kenji Arai
 Kenji Suzuki (footballer)
 Kenji Syed Rusydi
 Kenjiro Ogino
 Kenneth Chung
 Kenneth Gin Ying Doon
 Kenneth Golding
 Kenneth Jeyaretnam
 Kenneth Lyen
 Kenneth Michael Byrne
 Kenneth Murchison
 Kenneth Sansbury
 Kenneth Yeo
 Kenny Khoo
 Kenny Yap
 Kenon Holdings
 Kenpeitai East District Branch
 Kenpeitai West District Branch
 Kent Ridge
 Kent Ridge MRT station
 Kent Ridge Park
 Kenta Kurishima
 Kento Fujihara
 Kento Fukuda
 Kento Nagasaki
 Kenya Kodama
 Kenya Takahashi
 Kenya at the 2010 Summer Youth Olympics
 Kenya–Singapore relations
 Keong Saik Road
 Kepler (Stefanie Sun album)
 Keppel Bay Bridge
 Keppel Constituency
 Keppel Corporation
 Keppel Harbour
 Keppel Hill Reservoir
 Keppel Island, Singapore
 Keppel MRT station
 Keppel TatLee Bank
 Keppel Viaduct
 Ker Sin Tze
 Keramat Habib Noh
 Kerisik
 Kesavan Soon
 Keshav Kumar (football)
 Ketam Mountain Bike Park
 Ketna Patel
 Ketoprak (dish)
 Ketupat
 Kevin Hunt (footballer, born 1975)
 Kevin Kwan
 Kevin Lefranc
 Kevin Mathews
 Kevin McCann (footballer, born 1987)
 Khairin Nadim
 Khairul Amri
 Khairul Nizam
 Khairulhin Khalid
 Khaled Kharroubi
 Khan Investment Management
 Khatib MRT station
 Khatijah Surattee
 Khatijun Nissa Siraj
 Khaw Boon Wan
 Khe Bong Constituency
 Kho Jabing
 Khoo Boon Hui
 Khoo Jeffrey and others v Life Bible-Presbyterian Church and others
 Khoo Sook Yuen
 Khoo Swee Chiow
 Khoo Teck Puat
 Khoo Teck Puat Hospital
 Khoo Teh Lynn
 Khym Lam
 Kian Teck
 Kiasi
 Kiasu
 Kiatisuk Senamuang
 Kiddy Bag
 Kidnapper (film)
 Kidnapping Act (Singapore)
 Kiki Tay
 Killer Not Stupid
 Killiney Kopitiam
 Killing of Muawanatul Chasanah
 Killing of Nasiari Sunee
 Kim Chuan Depot
 Kim Dae-eui
 Kim Do-hoon
 Kim Eng Holdings
 Kim Grant (footballer)
 Kim Jae-hong
 Kim Jong-nam
 Kim Keat Single Member Constituency
 Kim Lim
 Kim Min-ho (footballer, born 1991)
 Kim Poulsen
 Kim Seng Bridge
 Kim Seng Road
 Kim Seng Single Member Constituency
 Kim Shin-wook
 Kim Tae-young (footballer, born 1987)
 Kim Yoon-sik
 Kim Young-kwang (footballer, born 1987)
 Kim-Chuan Toh
 Kimberly Chan
 Kimberly Chia
 Kimberly Lim
 Kimberly Lim (netball)
 Kimmo Tarkkio
 Kimura Riki
 Kin (Singaporean TV series)
 Kinabalu giant earthworm
 Kinetic Rain
 King Albert Park MRT station
 King Edward VII College of Medicine
 King Julien's Beach Party-Go-Round
 King Rat (Clavell novel)
 King of Culinary
 King of Mahjong
 Kingdom of Singapura
 Kingsley Njoku
 Kinship (TV series)
 Kinship Part 1 (TV series)
 Kinship Part 2 (TV series)
 Kiong Kong Tuan
 Kiria Tikanah
 Kiribati at the 2010 Summer Youth Olympics
 Kirk Wagar
 Kirpa Ram Vij
 Kirsten Han
 Kirsten Tan
 Kirstin Chen
 Kishon Philip
 Kishore Mahbubani
 Kit Chan
 Kite (Stefanie Sun album)
 KittyWu Records
 Kiyoshiro Tsuboi
 Knowlarity
 Knut Solem
 Ko Tai Chuen
 Kodai Sumikawa
 Kodai Tanaka
 Koh Boon Hwee
 Koh Buck Song
 Koh Chai Hong
 Koh Chieng Mun
 Koh Eng Kian
 Koh Eng Tian
 Koh Jia Ler
 Koh Juat Jong
 Koh Poh Koon
 Koh Seng Leong
 Koh Seow Chuan
 Kohga Tsuruhara
 Koichi Sugiyama (footballer)
 Kok Heng Leun
 Kok Kum Woh
 Koka (brand)
 Koki Akasaka
 Koki Sato
 Kolam Ayer Constituency
 Konami
 Kong Hee
 Kong Ho-won
 Kong Hwa School
 Kong Jaw-sheng
 Kong Meng San Phor Kark See Monastery
 Koo Tsai Kee
 Koobits
 Kopi (drink)
 Kopi tiam
 Kopi-O II
 Kopitiam (company)
 Koreans in Singapore
 Kornprom Jaroonpong
 Koruthaialos sindu
 Kosaku Inaba
 Kosovo–Singapore relations
 Kosuke Chiku
 Kosuke Matsuda (footballer, born 1991)
 Kotaro Takeda
 Kotaro Tokunaga
 Koto Kobayashi
 Koufu (company)
 Kovan MRT station
 Kovan double murders
 Kovan, Singapore
 Koya Yoshida
 Kranji
 Kranji Bus Depot
 Kranji Expressway
 Kranji MRT station
 Kranji Marshes
 Kranji Mile
 Kranji Racecourse
 Kranji Reservoir
 Kranji Reservoir Park
 Kranji Secondary School
 Kranji State Cemetery
 Kranji War Cemetery
 Kranji War Memorial
 Kranji railway station, Singapore
 Kra–Dai ethnic groups in Southeast Asia
 Kreta Ayer Road
 Kreta Ayer Single Member Constituency
 Kreta Ayer–Tanglin Group Representation Constituency
 Kris Rosales
 KrisFlyer
 KrisFlyer International Sprint
 Krishna Udayasankar
 Kristang language
 Kristang people
 Kristijan Krajček
 Kritsana Wongbudee
 Krongpol Daorueang
 Kshitij Shinde
 Kua Ee Heok
 Kuan Kim Seng
 Kubba Sportswear
 Kue kochi
 Kue lapis
 Kue makmur
 Kue semprong
 Kuih
 Kumaahran Sathasivam
 Kumar (Singaporean entertainer)
 Kumar Krishnan
 Kumari Nahappan
 Kumpei Kakuta
 Kunihiro Honda
 Kunihiro Yamashita
 Kunming–Singapore railway
 Kuo Chuan Constituency
 Kuo Chuan Presbyterian Primary School
 Kuo Chuan Presbyterian Secondary School
 Kuo Pao Kun
 Kuok Khoon Hong
 Kupang LRT station
 Kuraba Kondo
 Kusu Island
 Kwa Geok Choo
 Kwan Im Thong Hood Cho Temple
 Kwan Shan Mei
 Kwan Yin Chan Lin
 Kwang Sheng
 Kway chap
 Kwee family (Pontiac)
 Kwek Hong Png
 Kwek Leng Beng
 Kwon Da-kyung
 Kwong On Bank
 Kwong Wai Siew Peck San Theng
 Kygo
 Kym Ng
 Kyoto Protocol
 Kyrgyzstan at the 2010 Summer Youth Olympics
 Kévin Yann

L

 LASALLE College of the Arts
 LGBT art in Singapore
 LGBT culture in Singapore
 LGBT history in Singapore
 LGBT pride events in Singapore
 LGBT rights in Singapore
 LGBT topics in Singaporean literature
 LPGC Ayame
 La Femme (TV series)
 Labour Clauses (Public Contracts) Convention, 1949
 Labour Day (Singapore)
 Labour Front
 Labour Inspection Convention, 1947
 Labour Party (Singapore)
 Labour movement of Singapore
 Labrador Nature Reserve
 Labrador Park MRT station
 Labu dan Labi
 Ladan and Laleh Bijani
 Laddu
 Lady Kash
 Lady Kash and Krissy
 Lai Choy Heng
 Lai Chun Yuen Opera House
 Lai Chung Han
 Lai Kew Chai
 Lai Kui Fang
 Lai Siu Chiu
 Lai Yee Hing
 Laju incident
 Lakeside MRT station
 Laksa
 Lakshmi Vilas Bank
 Lalit Goel
 Lalit Kumar Goel
 Lam Chih Bing
 Lam Lay Yong
 Lam Pin Min
 Lam Yeo Coffee Powder Factory
 Lam Yi Young
 Lamoria adaptella
 Lampides boeticus
 Lan Shui
 Lana Cake Shop
 Lance Tan Wei Sheng
 Lance corporal
 Land Transport Authority
 Land reclamation in Singapore
 Landmark Books (publisher)
 Landmark sites in Singapore
 Lang Tong
 Language education in Singapore
 Language planning and policy in Singapore
 Languages of Singapore
 Laos at the 2010 Summer Youth Olympics
 Laos at the 2015 Southeast Asian Games
 Large Indian civet
 Large-footed bat
 Larry Davidson
 Lat Pau
 Latif Rahman
 Latvia at the 2010 Summer Youth Olympics
 Lau Chi Sing
 Lau Meng Meng
 Lau Pa Sat
 Lau Teik Oon
 Lau Teng Chuan
 Lau Ywen
 Laura Ashton
 Laurence Guillemard
 Laurent-Joseph-Marius Imbert
 Laurentia Tan
 Lavender MRT station
 Lavender, Singapore
 Law Society of Singapore
 Law Song Seng
 Law enforcement in Singapore
 Law of Singapore
 Lawrence Ang
 Lawrence Khong
 Lawrence Wong
 Lawrence Wong (actor)
 Lawyers in Singapore
 Lay Nam Chang
 Layar LRT station
 Lazada
 Lazarus Island
 Le Freeport
 Leader of the House (Singapore)
 Leader of the Opposition (Singapore)
 Leaena Tambyah
 Leandro Montebeler
 Leandro Okabe
 Least horseshoe bat
 Leave (album)
 Lebadea martha
 Lebanon at the 2010 Summer Youth Olympics
 Lee Ah Mooi Old Age Home
 Lee Bee Wah
 Lee Boon Wang
 Lee Boon Yang
 Lee Chak Men
 Lee Chiaw Meng
 Lee Chiong Giam
 Lee Choo Neo
 Lee Choon Seng
 Lee Fook Chee
 Lee Foundation
 Lee Ho-sung (footballer)
 Lee Hsien Loong
 Lee Hsien Yang
 Lee Khoon Choy
 Lee Kin Tat
 Lee Kong Chian
 Lee Kong Chian Natural History Museum
 Lee Kong Chian School of Business
 Lee Kong Chian School of Medicine
 Lee Kuan Yew
 Lee Kuan Yew School of Public Policy
 Lee Kwan-woo
 Lee Li Lian
 Lee Lim-saeng
 Lee Man Hon
 Lee Mao-shan
 Lee Pey Woan
 Lee Raymond
 Lee Run Hu
 Lee Sang-ha
 Lee Seng Tee
 Lee Seng Wee
 Lee Siew Choh
 Lee Teng (Singapore)
 Lee Tzu Pheng
 Lee Wei Ling
 Lee Wen
 Lee Wung Yew
 Lee Yi Shyan
 Lee Yock Suan
 Lee Yu Wen
 Lee family (Singapore)
 Leela Sarkar
 Leeroy Anton
 Legal Aid Bureau
 Legal Eagles (TV series)
 Legend of the Eight Immortals
 Legend of the White Hair Brides
 Legislative Assembly of Singapore
 Legislative Council of Singapore
 Legislative Council of the Straits Settlements
 Legitimate expectation in Singapore law
 Lei Tenglong
 Lei cha
 Leisure Park Kallang
 Lek-Heng Lim
 Lelio Popo
 Len Johnson (footballer)
 Lenddo
 Leng Ern Jee
 Leng Kee Single Member Constituency
 Lentor MRT station
 Leon Cheo
 Leon Jay Williams
 Leon Kwek
 Leon Perera
 Leonard Manasseh
 Leonard Ong
 Leonard Tan
 Leonard Wilson
 Leonel Felice
 Leong Mun Wai
 Leonid Moiseyev
 Leopard cat
 Leopoldo Girelli
 Leptosia nina
 Les Amis (restaurant)
 Leslie Chew
 Leslie Kee
 Leslie Khoo Kwee Hock
 Leslie Kwok
 Leslie Lam (doctor)
 Lesotho at the 2010 Summer Youth Olympics
 Lesser false vampire bat
 Lesser mouse-deer
 Lesser short-nosed fruit bat
 Let It Shine (2007 TV series)
 Let Me Tell You Something About That Night
 Let's Eat! (film)
 Let's Go Dating
 Let's Play Love
 Lethe europa
 Leung Sing Poh
 Lew Chuen Hong
 Lew Syn Pau
 Lewis Chua
 Lewis Heath
 Lewis Lew
 Lewis Tan
 Lexean
 Lexias dirtea
 Lexias pardalis
 Li (TV channel)
 Li Chenyang
 Li Jiawei
 Li Li (badminton)
 Li Lienfung
 Li Nanxing
 Li Ruofan
 Li Tixiang
 Li Wenhai (actor)
 Li Yinzhu
 Li Yujia
 Li Yunting
 Liam Shotton
 Lian Pin Koh
 Liang Court
 Liang Eng Hwa
 Liang Po Po: The Movie
 Liang Saizhen
 Liang Wern Fook
 Liang Xiaoyu
 Lianhe Wanbao
 Lianhe Zaobao
 Liaoning Guangyuan FC
 Liat Towers
 Liberal Socialist Party (Singapore)
 Liberia at the 2010 Summer Youth Olympics
 Libra Records
 Library Association of Singapore
 Library@chinatown
 Library@esplanade
 Library@harbourfront
 Library@orchard
 Libya at the 2010 Summer Youth Olympics
 Licuala ferruginea
 Liechtenstein at the 2010 Summer Youth Olympics
 Lien Ying Chow
 Lieutenant colonel
 Lieutenant general
 Liew Yuen Sien
 Life - Fear Not
 Life Bible-Presbyterian Church
 Life Hacks
 Life Is Beautiful (2015 TV series)
 Life Records
 Life imprisonment in Singapore
 Lift Upgrading Programme
 Light Rail Transit (Singapore)
 Light Strike Vehicle (Singapore)
 Lights! Camera! Action! Hosted by Steven Spielberg
 Like Father, Like Daughter
 Likee
 Lila Tan
 Lily Chung
 Lily Kong
 Lily Neo
 Lim Ah Siang
 Lim Ban Lim
 Lim Biow Chuan
 Lim Bo Seng
 Lim Bo Seng Memorial
 Lim Boon Heng
 Lim Boon Keng
 Lim Cheng Hoe
 Lim Chiew Peng
 Lim Chin Siong
 Lim Chu Kang
 Lim Chu Kang Camp II
 Lim Chuan Poh
 Lim Chwee Teck
 Lim Ding Wen
 Lim Hak Tai
 Lim Han Hoe
 Lim Heem Wei
 Lim Hiang Kok
 Lim Hng Kiang
 Lim Ho Puah
 Lim Hock Siew
 Lim Hwee Hua
 Lim Kah Leong
 Lim Kay Siu
 Lim Kay Tong
 Lim Kean Chye
 Lim Kim Choon
 Lim Kim San
 Lim Kok Ann
 Lim Koon Teck
 Lim Koon Yang
 Lim Ming Yan
 Lim Nang Seng
 Lim Nee Soon
 Lim Neo Chian
 Lim Pin
 Lim Seng Hoo
 Lim Shiya
 Lim Siong Guan
 Lim Soo Hoon
 Lim Soon Lee
 Lim Soon Seng
 Lim Swee Say
 Lim Tang Boon
 Lim Tean
 Lim Teck Pan
 Lim Teck Yin
 Lim Tong Hai
 Lim Tzay Chuen
 Lim Tze Peng
 Lim Wee Kiak
 Lim Yew Hock
 Lim Young-woo
 Lime (magazine)
 Limnonectes paramacrodon
 Limnonectes plicatellus
 Lin Chen (playwright)
 Lin Chien-Kwan
 Lin Hsin Hsin
 Lin Hsin Hsin Art Museum
 Lin Meijiao
 Lin Ye (table tennis)
 Lina Loh
 Lina Ng
 Linda Black (television presenter)
 Linda Chen
 Lindeteves-Jacoberg Limited
 Ling How Doong
 Ling Kai
 Linklaters
 Linying (singer-songwriter)
 Lion
 Lion City Cup
 Lion City Sailors FC
 Lion Mums 2
 Lion head symbol of Singapore
 Lion.Hearts
 Lionel Bond
 Lionel Chee
 Lionel Chok
 Lionel Khoo
 Lionel Lewis
 Lionel Tan
 Lions in Winter
 LionsXII
 Lip-Bu Tan
 Lippo Centre (Singapore)
 Liquor Control (Supply and Consumption) Act 2015
 Lisa Marie White
 Lisa Ng
 List of 2010 Summer Youth Olympics medal winners
 List of 96°C Café episodes
 List of Acts of Parliament in Singapore
 List of Against the Tide episodes
 List of Australian High Commissioners to Singapore
 List of Be Happy episodes
 List of Beyond Words episodes
 List of Blessings episodes
 List of Break Free episodes
 List of Buddhist temples in Singapore
 List of Catholic dioceses in Malaysia, Singapore and Brunei
 List of Chiefs of Defence Force (Singapore)
 List of Chinese criminal organizations
 List of Crimewatch (Singaporean TV series) episodes
 List of Devotion (TV series) episodes
 List of Dinosaur Train characters
 List of Disclosed episodes
 List of Don't Stop Believin' episodes
 List of Double Bonus episodes
 List of E City programmes in 2013
 List of Foreign Sports Talent Scheme athletes
 List of Game Plan episodes
 List of Global Schools Foundation schools
 List of Good Luck episodes
 List of Heritage Roads in Singapore
 List of Hero episodes
 List of High Commissioners of Malaysia to Singapore
 List of High Commissioners of New Zealand to Singapore
 List of High Commissioners of the United Kingdom to Singapore
 List of Hindu temples in Singapore
 List of Home Truly episodes
 List of Hwa Chong Institution people
 List of I'm in Charge episodes
 List of In the Name of Love episodes
 List of Indian organisations in Singapore
 List of Indians in Singapore
 List of Justice in the City episodes
 List of Kampong Ties episodes
 List of Kangchu system placename etymologies
 List of Kinship episodes
 List of LGBT organisations in Singapore
 List of Life Is Beautiful episodes
 List of Living with Lydia episodes
 List of Malay Film Productions films
 List of Malay Singaporeans
 List of Malay-language television channels
 List of Michelin starred restaurants in Singapore
 List of Mind Game episodes
 List of National Junior College alumni
 List of National University of Singapore people
 List of ONE Championship alumni
 List of ONE Championship events
 List of ONE bonus award recipients
 List of Oddbods episodes
 List of On the Red Dot episodes
 List of Phua Chu Kang Pte Ltd episodes
 List of Pillow Talk (TV series) episodes
 List of Poetic Justice episodes
 List of Point of Entry episodes
 List of Republic of Singapore Air Force squadrons
 List of Scoot destinations
 List of SilkAir destinations
 List of Singapore Airlines Cargo destinations
 List of Singapore Airlines destinations
 List of Singapore Armed Forces bases
 List of Singapore International Film Festival awards
 List of Singapore LRT stations
 List of Singapore MRT and LRT lines
 List of Singapore MRT and LRT rolling stock
 List of Singapore MRT stations
 List of Singapore Open men's doubles champions
 List of Singapore Open men's singles champions
 List of Singapore Open mixed doubles champions
 List of Singapore Open women's doubles champions
 List of Singapore Open women's singles champions
 List of Singapore abbreviations
 List of Singapore football transfers in 2013
 List of Singapore international footballers born outside Singapore
 List of Singapore opposition party MPs elected
 List of Singapore police officers killed in the line of duty
 List of Singapore representatives at international male beauty pageants
 List of Singapore women Twenty20 International cricketers
 List of Singapore's football leagues winners
 List of Singaporean Americans
 List of Singaporean Community Development Councils (1997–2001)
 List of Singaporean Community Development Councils (2001–2006)
 List of Singaporean Community Development Councils (2006–2011)
 List of Singaporean Community Development Councils (2011–2015)
 List of Singaporean Indians
 List of Singaporean LGBT documentaries
 List of Singaporean dishes
 List of Singaporean dissidents
 List of Singaporean electoral divisions (1948–1951)
 List of Singaporean electoral divisions (1951–1955)
 List of Singaporean electoral divisions (1955–1959)
 List of Singaporean electoral divisions (1959–1963)
 List of Singaporean electoral divisions (1963–1968)
 List of Singaporean electoral divisions (1968–1972)
 List of Singaporean electoral divisions (1972–1976)
 List of Singaporean electoral divisions (1976–1980)
 List of Singaporean electoral divisions (1980–1984)
 List of Singaporean electoral divisions (1984–1988)
 List of Singaporean electoral divisions (1988–1991)
 List of Singaporean electoral divisions (1991–1997)
 List of Singaporean electoral divisions (1997–2001)
 List of Singaporean electoral divisions (2001–2006)
 List of Singaporean electoral divisions (2006–2011)
 List of Singaporean electoral divisions (2011–2015)
 List of Singaporean electoral divisions (2015–2020)
 List of Singaporean films
 List of Singaporean films of 2010
 List of Singaporean films of 2011
 List of Singaporean films of 2012
 List of Singaporean films of 2013
 List of Singaporean films of 2014
 List of Singaporean films of 2015
 List of Singaporean films of the 2010s
 List of Singaporean flags
 List of Singaporean football transfer 2022
 List of Singaporean inventions and discoveries
 List of Singaporean patriotic songs
 List of Singaporean records in Olympic weightlifting
 List of Singaporean records in athletics
 List of Singaporean records in speed skating
 List of Singaporean records in swimming
 List of Singaporean records in track cycling
 List of Singaporean submissions for the Academy Award for Best International Feature Film
 List of Singaporean town councils
 List of Singaporeans
 List of Singaporeans by net worth
 List of Soup of Life episodes
 List of Sudden episodes
 List of Super Senior episodes
 List of The Dream Job episodes
 List of The Dream Makers episodes
 List of The Gentlemen episodes
 List of The Golden Path characters
 List of The In-Laws (TV series) episodes
 List of The Journey episodes
 List of The Noose episodes
 List of The Queen episodes
 List of The Truth Seekers episodes
 List of The Ultimatum episodes
 List of Three Wishes episodes
 List of Tiger Mum episodes
 List of Together (TV series) episodes
 List of Unriddle episodes
 List of VV Drama dramas in 2013
 List of Vogue Singapore cover models
 List of World at Your Feet episodes
 List of You Can Be an Angel 2 episodes
 List of You Can Be an Angel Too episodes
 List of Your Hand In Mine episodes
 List of Yours Fatefully episodes
 List of airlines of Singapore
 List of airports by ICAO code: W
 List of airports in Singapore
 List of ambassadors of China to Singapore
 List of ambassadors of Indonesia to Singapore
 List of ambassadors of Israel to Singapore
 List of ambassadors of Russia to Singapore
 List of ambassadors of Singapore
 List of ambassadors of Singapore to China
 List of ambassadors of Singapore to France
 List of ambassadors of Singapore to Japan
 List of ambassadors of Singapore to Laos
 List of ambassadors of Singapore to Russia
 List of ambassadors of Singapore to the United States
 List of ambassadors of the Philippines to Singapore
 List of ambassadors of the United States to Singapore
 List of amphibians of Singapore
 List of arts and entertainment venues in Singapore
 List of banks in Singapore
 List of beaches in Singapore
 List of birds of Singapore
 List of bishops of the Methodist Church in Singapore
 List of botanical gardens in Singapore
 List of bridges in Singapore
 List of buildings and structures in Singapore
 List of bus routes in Singapore
 List of bus stations in Singapore
 List of butterflies of Singapore
 List of by-elections in Singapore
 List of cancer treatment centres in Singapore
 List of cases affected by the Kho Jabing case
 List of cathedrals in Singapore
 List of chief secretaries of Singapore
 List of cinemas in Singapore
 List of commercial sites in Singapore
 List of common Chinese surnames
 List of companies listed on the Singapore Exchange
 List of companies of Singapore
 List of countries with the Islamic symbols displayed on their flag
 List of cricket grounds in Singapore
 List of current ONE fighters
 List of dams and reservoirs in Singapore
 List of defunct airlines of Singapore
 List of diplomatic missions in Singapore
 List of diplomatic missions of Singapore
 List of disability organisations in Singapore
 List of drama serials with all four Star Awards acting nominations
 List of equipment of the Republic of Singapore Navy
 List of equipment of the Singapore Army
 List of extreme points of Singapore
 List of festivals in Singapore
 List of films banned in Singapore
 List of flag bearers for Singapore at the Olympics
 List of football clubs in Singapore
 List of former bus stations in Singapore
 List of game companies in Singapore
 List of governors of Singapore
 List of governors of the Straits Settlements
 List of heliports in Singapore
 List of highest-grossing films in Singapore
 List of hospitals in Singapore
 List of hosts with two or more Star Awards in hosting categories
 List of hotels in Singapore
 List of international schools in Singapore
 List of islands of Singapore
 List of largest companies in Singapore
 List of libraries in Singapore
 List of lighthouses in Singapore
 List of magazines in Singapore
 List of major crimes in Singapore
 List of major crimes in Singapore (2000–present)
 List of major crimes in Singapore (before 2000)
 List of mammals of Singapore
 List of massacres in Singapore
 List of members of the 12th Parliament of Singapore
 List of members of the 13th Parliament of Singapore
 List of memorials in Singapore
 List of military training deaths in Singapore
 List of mosques in Singapore
 List of mudras (dance)
 List of museums in Singapore
 List of newspapers in Singapore
 List of number-one songs of 2018 (Singapore)
 List of number-one songs of 2019 (Singapore)
 List of number-one songs of 2020 (Singapore)
 List of number-one songs of 2021 (Singapore)
 List of number-one songs of 2022 (Singapore)
 List of number-one songs of 2023 (Singapore)
 List of parks in Singapore
 List of past Singaporean electoral divisions
 List of places in Singapore
 List of political parties in Singapore
 List of power stations in Singapore
 List of primary schools in Singapore
 List of prizes, medals, and awards in Singapore
 List of programmes broadcast by CNA
 List of programmes broadcast by Channel 5 (Singapore)
 List of programmes broadcast by Channel U (Singapore)
 List of programmes broadcast by Mediacorp Channel 8
 List of programs broadcast by Mediacorp Vasantham
 List of public art in Singapore
 List of radio stations in Singapore
 List of recorders of Penang, Singapore, and Malacca
 List of reptiles of Singapore
 List of restaurants in Singapore
 List of riots in Singapore
 List of rivers of Singapore
 List of schools in Singapore
 List of secondary schools in Singapore
 List of service reservoirs in Singapore
 List of serving general and flag officers of the Singapore Armed Forces
 List of ships of the Republic of Singapore Navy
 List of shopping malls in Singapore
 List of social service agencies in Singapore
 List of stadiums in Singapore
 List of tallest buildings in Singapore
 List of think tanks in Singapore
 List of titles and honours of Elizabeth II
 List of tourist attractions in Singapore
 List of underpasses and tunnels in Singapore
 List of universities in Singapore
 List of visual artists from Singapore
 List of waterways in Singapore
 List of websites blocked in Singapore
 List of years in Singapore
 List of youth organisations in Singapore
 Lists of members of parliament in Singapore
 Lithuania at the 2010 Summer Youth Olympics
 Little India MRT station
 Little India, Singapore
 Little Ironies: Stories of Singapore
 Little Tournament Over Yonder
 Little Women (2022 TV series)
 Little red dot
 Liu Guodong
 Liu Kang (artist)
 Liu Teng
 Liu Thai Ker
 Liu Yichang
 Live Again (TV series)
 Living with Lydia
 Ljutvo Bugucanin
 Lloyd Butler (footballer)
 Lloyd Valberg
 Lo Hwei Yen
 Lo Man Yi
 Lo mai gai
 Lobang King
 Lock Han Chng Jonathan v Goh Jessiline
 Lodewijk Christiaan van Wachem
 Logie Danson
 Loh Kean Hean
 Loh Kean Yew
 Loh Kok Heng
 Loh Miaw Gong
 Loke Cheng Kim
 Loke Wan Tho
 Loke Yew
 Lon bin Mohamed Noor
 Long Beach Seafood Restaurant
 Long Gen
 Long John Silver's
 Long Long Time Ago
 Long Long Time Ago 2
 Long Service Medal (Military) (Singapore)
 Long Ya Men
 Long hair in Singapore
 Long-nosed horned frog
 Long-tongued nectar bat
 Loo Zihan
 Look Yan Kit
 LookAtMe
 Looking for Stars
 Lophiocharon trisignatus
 Lor mee
 Lords Mobile
 Loretta Chen
 Lorong Boys
 Lorong Chuan
 Lorong Chuan MRT station
 Lorong Halus
 Lorraine Tan
 Losaria coon
 Lost N Found
 Lot One
 Louis Ah Mouy
 Louis Chen Hsiao Yun
 Louis Chua
 Louis Clark (English footballer)
 Louis Mountbatten, 1st Earl Mountbatten of Burma
 Louis Ng
 Louis Theroux
 Love 97.2FM
 Love Blossoms
 Love Blossoms II
 Love Is All Around (TV series)
 Love Matters
 Love Me, Kelly
 Love Me, Love Me Not (Singaporean TV series)
 Love Thy Neighbour (Singaporean TV series)
 Love and Love
 Love at 0°C
 Love at First Light
 Love at Risk
 Lovense
 Loving Hut
 Low Ji Wen
 Low Kay Hwa
 Low Kim Pong
 Low Kiok Chiang
 Low Thia Khiang
 Low Yen Ling
 Lowave
 Lower Peirce Reservoir
 Lower Peirce Reservoir Park
 Lower Seletar Reservoir
 Loxura atymnus
 Loyang Bus Depot
 Loyang MRT station
 Loyang View Secondary School
 Loyang, Singapore
 Lozan Kotsev
 Loïc Leclercq
 Lucas Chow
 Lucas Jester
 Lucas Ng
 Lucasfilm Animation
 Lucian Dronca
 Lucie Yi Is Not a Romantic
 Lucien Wong
 Lucky Boy (2017 film)
 Lucky Diokpara
 Lucky Plaza
 Ludovick Takam
 Lui Pao Chuen
 Lui Tuck Yew
 Luigi Bressan
 Luis Closa
 Luis Hicks
 Luisa Gan
 Luiz Júnior (footballer, born 1990)
 Luka Lalić
 Luka Savić
 Luke Lee
 Luke O'Nien
 Lukmon Anifaloyin
 Lulu the Movie
 Lunarin
 Luo Haocai
 Lush 99.5FM
 Lutheran Church in Malaysia
 Lutheran Church in Singapore
 Luthrodes pandava
 Lutz Pfannenstiel
 Luxembourg at the 2010 Summer Youth Olympics
 Lycodon capucinus
 Lydia Kwa
 Lydia de Vega
 Lynette Lim
 Lynn Collins
 Lynn Tan
 Lynnette Seah
 Lyo and Merly
 Lysa Aya Trenier
 Lü Chen Chung

M

 M Ravi
 M. Bala Subramanion
 M. Balakrishnan
 M. Karathu
 M. Nasir
 M. R. Henderson
 M. Venkataramana
 M1 (Singaporean company)
 M1 Singapore Fringe Festival
 MAD School
 MARPOL 73/78
 MAS Electronic Payment System
 MATADOR
 MICappella
 MLBB M3 World Championship
 MOBTV
 MOL Presence
 MONEY FM 89.3
 MOS Burger
 MPF Industry Group
 MPH Group
 MSC Napoli
 MTV (Asian TV channel)
 MTV Europe Music Award for Best Southeast Asian Act
 MTV Live (International TV channel)
 MTower
 MV Avatar
 MV Danny F II
 MV Dromus (1938)
 MV Empire Star (1935)
 MV Höegh Osaka
 MV Kota Wajar
 MV Leisure World
 MV Nyora
 MV Star Osakana
 MV Stolt Commitment
 MV Swift Rescue
 MV Thorco Cloud
 MV York
 Ma Chongchong
 MacDonald House
 MacDonald House bombing
 MacPherson MRT station
 MacPherson Single Member Constituency
 MacPherson, Singapore
 MacRitchie Reservoir
 Macedonia at the 2010 Summer Youth Olympics
 Madagascar at the 2010 Summer Youth Olympics
 Madagascar: A Crate Adventure
 Madam White Snake (TV series)
 Madame Tussauds Singapore
 Maddy Barber
 Madeleine Lee (writer)
 Madeleine Lim
 Madhu Mohana
 Madhuca sessilis
 Madrasah Al-Arabiah Al-Islamiah
 Madrasah Al-Maarif Al-Islamiah
 Madrasah Aljunied Al-Islamiah
 Madrasah Alsagoff Al-Arabiah
 Madrasah Irsyad Zuhri Al-Islamiah
 Madrasahs in Singapore
 Madrid Protocol
 Madu Tiga
 Madurese language
 Maersk Honam
 Maestro guitars
 Magdalena Bogdziewicz
 Maggi & Me
 Maggie Lim
 Maghain Aboth Synagogue
 Maghain Aboth Synagogue attack plot
 Maghihintay Pa Rin
 Magic Potion Spin
 Magical Sentosa
 Magnolia (Fraser and Neave brand)
 Magnus Böcker
 Mah Bow Tan
 Mah Li Lian
 Mahadevan Sathasivam
 Mahathir Azeman
 Mahbub Uz Zaman
 Mahiro Takahashi
 Mahmoud Mohamed Aboud
 Maia Lee
 Main Upgrading Programme
 Maintenance and Engineering Support (Singapore Army)
 Maintenance of Religious Harmony Act
 Maitland Madge
 Majid Ariff
 Majid Namjoo-Motlagh
 Majlis Ugama Islam Singapura
 Major general
 Maju MRT station
 Majulah Singapura
 Mak Chun Kit
 Mak Ho Wai
 Mak Pak Shee
 Makam Diraja Johor Telok Blangah
 Make It Big Big
 Making Miracles
 Makoto Ito (footballer)
 Maksat Dzhakybaliev
 Malawi at the 2010 Summer Youth Olympics
 Malay Film Productions
 Malay Heritage Centre
 Malay Singaporeans
 Malay Union
 Malay Village
 Malay cuisine
 Malay folklore
 Malay language
 Malay styles and titles
 Malay trade and creole languages
 Malaya Command
 Malaya and British Borneo dollar
 Malaya-Borneo Exhibition
 Malayan Bank Chambers
 Malayan Communist Party
 Malayan Emergency
 Malayan Forum
 Malayan Peoples' Anti-Japanese Army
 Malayan campaign
 Malayan civet
 Malayan dollar
 Malayan forest gecko
 Malayan porcupine
 Malayan slit-faced bat
 Malayness
 Malays (ethnic group)
 Malaysia Act 1963
 Malaysia Agreement
 Malaysia Bill
 Malaysia Day
 Malaysia at the 1964 Summer Olympics
 Malaysia at the 1993 Southeast Asian Games
 Malaysia at the 2009 Asian Youth Games
 Malaysia at the 2010 Summer Youth Olympics
 Malaysia at the 2015 Southeast Asian Games
 Malaysian Chinese Association
 Malaysian Indian Congress
 Malaysian Islamic Party
 Malaysian Malaysia
 Malaysian Tamil
 Malaysian chicken export ban
 Malaysians in Singapore
 Malaysia–Singapore Airlines
 Malaysia–Singapore Points of Agreement of 1990
 Malaysia–Singapore Second Link
 Malaysia–Singapore Third Crossing
 Malaysia–Singapore border
 Malaysia–Singapore relations
 Maldives at the 2010 Summer Youth Olympics
 Malek Awab
 Malesian frog
 Mali at the 2010 Summer Youth Olympics
 Maliki Osman
 Malta at the 2010 Summer Youth Olympics
 Mama shop
 Mamadou Diallo (footballer, born 1990)
 Mamak stall
 Mamoru Shinozaki
 Man at Forty
 Man of the House (TV series)
 Mana Mana Beach Club
 Management Development Institute of Singapore
 Manahi Nitama Paewai
 Manasseh Meyer
 Manato Takahashi
 Mandai
 Mandai Crematorium and Columbarium
 Mandai Depot
 Mandai Road
 Mandai Wildlife Bridge
 Mandai Wildlife Group
 Mandai burnt car murder
 Mandarin Chinese
 Mandarin Oriental Hotel Group
 Mandarin Oriental, Singapore
 Mandy Goh
 Mango pudding
 Mangroves of the Straits of Malacca
 Mani the parakeet
 Maniac World Tour
 Manicasothy Saravanamuttu
 Manila Accord
 Manis Lamond
 Manja (magazine)
 Manjusri Secondary School
 Mannings
 Manpreet Singh (Singaporean cricketer)
 Mansour Lakehal
 Maphilindo
 Mapletree Investments
 Marc Brian Louis
 Marc Fennell
 Marc Ryan Tan
 Marcus Chin
 Marcus Elliott
 Marcus Koh
 Marcus Phillips (footballer)
 Marcus Wheeler (footballer)
 Marcus Yap
 Mardan Mamat
 Marek Zalewski (archbishop)
 Margaret Dryburgh
 Margaret Heng
 Margaret Lee (Singaporean actress)
 Margaret Leng Tan
 Margaret Lin Xavier
 Maria Dyer
 Maria Hertogh
 Mariam Baharum
 Mariam El-Masri
 Mariam Jaafar
 Mariani (actress)
 Marijan Šuto
 Mariko Oi
 Marin Vidošević
 Marina Barrage
 Marina Bay Cruise Centre Singapore
 Marina Bay Financial Centre
 Marina Bay MRT station
 Marina Bay Sands
 Marina Bay Street Circuit
 Marina Bay Suites
 Marina Bay, Singapore
 Marina Boulevard
 Marina Centre
 Marina Chan
 Marina Channel
 Marina City Park
 Marina Coastal Expressway
 Marina East
 Marina One
 Marina Promenade, Singapore
 Marina Reservoir
 Marina South
 Marina South MRT station
 Marina South Pier
 Marina South Pier MRT station
 Marina Square
 Marine Life Park
 Marine Parade
 Marine Parade Community Building
 Marine Parade Constituency
 Marine Parade Group Representation Constituency
 Marine Parade MRT station
 Marine Parade Public Library
 Marine Terrace MRT station
 Mario Kart: Bowser's Challenge
 Maris Stella High School
 Marita Skammelsrud Lund
 Marital rape immunity in Singapore
 Maritime Building
 Maritime Labour Convention
 Maritime Security Command
 Maritime Security Task Force
 Maritime Square (subzone)
 Maritime and Port Authority of Singapore
 Marjorie Doggett
 Mark Bin Bakar
 Mark Chan
 Mark Chay
 Mark Hartmann
 Mark Lee (Singaporean actor)
 Mark McGough (soccer)
 Mark Phooi
 Mark Weedon (cricketer)
 Mark Williams (footballer, born 1981)
 Market Place (supermarket)
 Marko Kraljević (footballer)
 Marks & Spencer
 Marlborough Cinema
 Marquin Chandler
 Marrakesh Agreement
 Marrakesh VIP Treaty
 Marrie Lee
 Mars Vs. Venus
 Mars vs Venus
 Marshall Cavendish
 Marshall Islands at the 2010 Summer Youth Olympics
 Marsiling
 Marsiling MRT station
 Marsiling Park
 Marsiling Secondary School
 Marsiling–Yew Tee Group Representation Constituency
 Martin Soong
 Martin Tierney
 Martina Veloso
 Martyn See
 Martín Wagner
 Marvan Atapattu
 Mary Chee Bee Kiang
 Mary Klass
 Mary Quintal
 Mary W. S. Wong
 Marymount MRT station
 Marymount Single Member Constituency
 Marymount, Singapore
 Marzuki Elias
 Mas Selamat Kastari
 Masagos Zulkifli
 Masahiro Fukasawa
 Masahiro Ishikawa
 Masahiro Sugita
 Masala (TV series)
 Masala dosa
 Masanaga Kageyama
 Masao Nakayama
 Masatake Sato
 Masato Fukui
 Masaya Idetsu
 Masjid Abdul Aleem Siddique
 Masjid Abdul Gaffoor
 Masjid Abdul Hamid
 Masjid Ahmad
 Masjid Ahmad Ibrahim
 Masjid Al Islah
 Masjid Al-Abdul Razak
 Masjid Al-Abrar
 Masjid Al-Amin
 Masjid Al-Ansar
 Masjid Al-Falah, Singapore
 Masjid Al-Firdaus
 Masjid Al-Huda
 Masjid Al-Iman
 Masjid Al-Istighfar
 Masjid Al-Istiqamah
 Masjid Al-Khair
 Masjid Al-Mawaddah
 Masjid Al-Muttaqin
 Masjid Alkaff Kampung Melayu
 Masjid An-Nahdhah
 Masjid Bencoolen
 Masjid Darul Ghufran
 Masjid Darul Makmur
 Masjid En-Naeem
 Masjid Haji Yusoff
 Masjid Hajjah Fatimah
 Masjid Hang Jebat
 Masjid Jamae
 Masjid Malabar
 Masjid Omar Kampong Melaka
 Masjid Sallim Mattar
 Masjid Taha
 Masjid Temenggong Daeng Ibrahim
 Masjid Tentera Diraja
 Masjid Yusof Ishak
 Masrezwan Masturi
 Mass Rapid Transit (Singapore)
 Mass media in Singapore
 Massimo Alioto
 Master Raindrop
 Master Swordsman Lu Xiaofeng
 Master Swordsman Lu Xiaofeng 2
 Master sergeant
 Master warrant officer
 MasterChef Asia
 MasterChef Singapore
 MasterChef Singapore (season 1)
 MasterChef Singapore (season 2)
 Masterbulk
 Masters of the Sea (TV series)
 Mat Noh
 Matapa aria
 Mateo Roskam
 Mathanavelu Pillai
 Mathavakannan Kalimuthu
 Mathieu Delahaigue
 Matilda House
 Matrimonial law of Singapore
 Matrix Cable System
 Matt Carmichael (footballer)
 Matt Hume
 Mattar MRT station
 Matthew Palmer (footballer)
 Matthew Tan
 Matthew Yap
 Matthew and the Mandarins
 Matthias Hoene
 Matthias Verschave
 Matthias Yao
 Matthias Yap
 Mauritania at the 2010 Summer Youth Olympics
 Mauritius at the 2010 Summer Youth Olympics
 Mavis Hee
 Max Nicholson (footballer)
 Maxi Lim
 Maxime Belouet
 Maxime Lestienne
 Maxspid
 Maxwell MRT station
 May Ooi
 May Wong
 Maya Jayapal
 Maybank Kim Eng
 Maybank Tower (Singapore)
 Mayflower MRT station
 Mayflower Secondary School
 Ma–Xi meeting
 Mba Vitus Onyekachi
 McCallum Street
 McDonald's boys case
 MeWATCH
 Meal for Three
 Mean of Platts Singapore
 Meant to Be (TV series)
 Measure of Man
 Meat floss
 MechWarrior: Tactical Command
 Media Development Authority
 Media censorship in Singapore
 Media classifications in Singapore
 MediaCorp Teletext
 Mediacorp
 Mediacorp Subaru Impreza WRX Challenge
 Medical (Therapy, Education and Research) Act
 Medisave
 Mee Pok Man
 Mee goreng
 Mee pok
 Mee rebus
 Mee siam
 Meet-the-People Sessions
 Mega Adventure Park
 Megan Zheng
 Megisba malaya
 Mehmet Güney
 Meidi-Ya
 Meira Chand
 Melanitis leda
 Melisa Teo
 Melissa Chen
 Melody Teo
 Melville McKee
 Melvin Yong
 Melvinder Kanth
 Melvyn Ong
 Melvyn Tan
 Memetic Computing Society
 Men in White (2007 film)
 Meng Ong
 Meng Yang
 Menstrual Man
 Mental Health (Care and Treatment) Act
 Mental health in Singapore
 Mental health in Singapore during the colonial period
 Mercy Relief
 Merdeka Bridge, Singapore
 Merdeka Generation Package
 Meridian Junior College
 Meridian LRT station
 Meridian Secondary School
 Merlion
 Merlion Cup
 Merlion Cup (basketball)
 Merlion Masters
 Merlion Park
 Merpati Nusantara destinations
 Merton Beckwith-Smith
 Mervyn Tan
 Merzagua Abderrazak
 Message in a Bottle (album)
 Metallyticus splendidus
 Metamorphosis (TV series)
 Meteorological Service Singapore
 Methodist Church in Singapore
 Methodist Girls' School, Singapore
 Metre Convention
 Metro (department store)
 Metzia mesembrinum
 Mexico at the 2010 Summer Youth Olympics
 Mexico–Singapore relations
 Mi Lu Bing
 Mi Lu Bing (album)
 Miao Xin Vihara
 Michael Aw
 Michael Chan, Baron Chan
 Michael Chiang
 Michael Chua
 Michael Hwang
 Michael King (footballer)
 Michael P. Fay
 Michael P. Howlett
 Michael Palmer (politician)
 Michael Pike
 Michael Robert Blakey
 Michael Sullivan (art historian)
 Michael Tay
 Michael Tweedie
 Michael Whitley
 Michael Wright (field hockey)
 Michael Yani
 Michal Váňa
 Michel Olçomendy
 Michelle Chia
 Michelle Chong
 Michelle Goh
 Michelle Saram
 Michelle Tong
 Michelle Wong
 Michiaki Kakimoto
 Michihisa Nagasawa
 Mick Keelty
 Mick Walker (footballer, born 1940)
 Microhyla fissipes
 Microhyla heymonsi
 Microhyla mantheyi
 Middle Road, Singapore
 Miesha Tate
 Mightiest Mother-in-Law
 Migrant Worker Poetry Competition
 Mike Kasem
 Mike Lomax
 Mike Wong Mun Heng
 Mikiya Yamada
 Miletus biggsii
 Miletus gopara
 Miletus symethus
 Military forces based in Brunei
 Military history of Singapore
 Miljan Mrdaković
 Millenia Singapore
 Millenia Tower
 Millennia Institute
 Millennium & Copthorne Hotels
 Millennium Times Square New York
 Million Dollar Money Drop: Singapore Edition
 Milo (drink)
 Milo dinosaur
 Milomir Šešlija
 Milouš Kvaček
 Miloš Jevtić
 Mimi Wong
 Min Chinese
 Min Chinese speakers
 Min Lee
 Min Zhou
 Min-Liang Tan
 Minangkabau businesspeople
 Minangkabau people
 Mind Game (TV series)
 Mind Matters
 MindChamps
 Mindee Ong
 Minfong Ho
 Ming Bridges
 Ming Wong
 Minimum Age Convention, 1973
 Minister Mentor
 Minister-in-charge of Muslim Affairs
 Ministry of Communications and Information
 Ministry of Community Development, Youth and Sports
 Ministry of Culture, Community and Youth
 Ministry of Defence (Singapore)
 Ministry of Education (Singapore)
 Ministry of Education Language Centre
 Ministry of Finance (Singapore)
 Ministry of Foreign Affairs (Singapore)
 Ministry of Health (Singapore)
 Ministry of Home Affairs (Singapore)
 Ministry of Interior and Defence
 Ministry of Law (Singapore)
 Ministry of Manpower (Singapore)
 Ministry of National Development (Singapore)
 Ministry of Social and Family Development
 Ministry of Sustainability and the Environment
 Ministry of Trade and Industry (Singapore)
 Ministry of Transport (Singapore)
 Mint Museum of Toys
 Minute To Win It: Singapore
 Miranda Yap
 Mirko Grabovac
 Mirko Jurilj
 Mirko Šugić
 Miroslav Krištić
 Miroslav Latiak
 Miroslav Pejić
 Mirza Delimeđac
 Mirza Mohamed Ali Namazie
 Mislav Karoglan
 Miss Earth Singapore
 Miss Malaya 1954
 Miss Singapore 1958
 Miss Singapore International
 Miss Singapore World
 Miss Universe 1987
 Miss Universe Singapore
 Missing (Singaporean TV series)
 Missing You (2008 film)
 Mister International
 Misuse of Drugs Act (Singapore)
 Mitsubishi Heavy Industries Crystal Mover C810
 Mitsubishi Heavy Industries Crystal Mover C810A
 Mitsubishi Heavy Industries Crystal Mover C810D
 Mitsuki Ichihara
 Mix Master: Final Force
 Mixed-NOCs at the 2010 Summer Youth Olympics
 Mizuno Ekiden
 Mladen Pralija
 Mm2 Entertainment
 Mo Zhi Hong
 Mobilewalla
 Modak
 Modern pentathlon at the 2010 Summer Youth Olympics
 Modern pentathlon at the 2010 Summer Youth Olympics – Boys' individual
 Modern pentathlon at the 2010 Summer Youth Olympics – Girls' individual
 Modern pentathlon at the 2010 Summer Youth Olympics – Mixed relay
 Moduza procris
 Mohamad Fuzi Harun
 Mohamed Doumbouya
 Mohamed Faizal Mohamed Abdul Kadir
 Mohamed Ismail Gafoor
 Mohamed Latiff Mohamed
 Mohamed Salleh Marican
 Mohamed Sharael Taha
 Mohamed Shoib
 Mohammad Din Mohammad
 Mohammad Khakpour
 Mohammad Khorramgah
 Mohammad Naeem Rahimi
 Mohammad Salahuddin
 Mohan Kankanhalli
 Mohd Effendi Norwawi
 Mohd Fahmi Aliman
 Mohd Mardani
 Mohd Noor Ali
 Mojtaba Esmaeilzadeh
 Mojtaba Tehranizadeh
 Mok Ying Ren
 Moldova at the 2010 Summer Youth Olympics
 Moleac
 Molly Tay
 Molly, Lady Huggins
 Molson Canadian Rocks for Toronto
 Moments of Magic
 Momo Latiff
 Monaco at the 2010 Summer Youth Olympics
 Monetary Authority of Singapore
 Money No Enough
 Money No Enough 2
 Mongolia at the 2010 Summer Youth Olympics
 Mongolia–Singapore relations
 Monk's Hill Secondary School
 Monkey tree phenomenon
 Monomorium hospitum
 Monsef Zerka
 Monsoon Books
 Montenegro at the 2010 Summer Youth Olympics
 Montfort Secondary School
 Month of Photography Asia
 Montreal Convention
 Montreal Protocol
 Moon Soon-ho
 Mooreana trichoneura
 Moresche (footballer, born 1998)
 Morgan Chua
 Morning Express (Singaporean TV current affairs series)
 Morning Express (Singaporean TV drama series)
 Morocco at the 2010 Summer Youth Olympics
 Morrison Hashii
 Mosaic Music Festival
 Moses Lim
 Moses Tay
 Mosque Street
 Mothership (website)
 Moudourou Moise
 Moulmein Single Member Constituency
 Moulmein–Kallang Group Representation Constituency
 Mount Alvernia Hospital
 Mount Elizabeth Hospital
 Mount Elizabeth Novena Hospital
 Mount Emily Park
 Mount Emily Reservoir
 Mount Faber
 Mount Pleasant MRT station
 Mount Pleasant Road, Singapore
 Mount Vernon Camp
 Mount Vernon Columbarium
 Mount Vernon, Singapore
 Mountbatten MRT station
 Mountbatten Single Member Constituency
 Mountbatten, Singapore
 Moussa Keita
 Mouty Ousseni
 Movement for the Intellectually Disabled of Singapore
 Moving Notes...Kelvin Tan
 Mozambique at the 2010 Summer Youth Olympics
 Mr Bean (company)
 Mr. Midnight
 Mr. Midnight: Beware the Monsters
 Mr. Unbelievable
 Mrbrown
 Mrs P.I.
 Muhaimin Suhaimi
 Muhamad Faisal Manap
 Muhamad Hosni Muhamad
 Muhamad Ridhwan
 Muhammad Abdul Aleem Siddiqi
 Muhammad Ali Aman
 Muhammad Faishal Ibrahim
 Muhammad Iqbal Abdul Rahman
 Muhammad Jailani Abu Talib
 Muhammad Jalaluddin Sayeed
 Muhammad Taqi (referee)
 Muhelmy Suhaimi
 Mukundan Maran
 Mulewa Dharmichand
 Mun Seung-man
 Municipal Commission of Singapore
 Municipal North-East Constituency
 Municipal Services Office (Singapore)
 Municipal South-West Constituency
 Munier Raychouni
 Muon (band)
 Murai Urban Training Facility
 Murali Pillai
 Murata Manufacturing
 Murder of Cheng Geok Ha
 Murder of Clementina Curci
 Murder of Dexmon Chua
 Murder of Frankie Tan
 Murder of Huang Na
 Murder of Iordanka Apostolova
 Murder of Koh Ngiap Yong
 Murder of Kuah Bee Hong
 Murder of Lee Kim Lai
 Murder of Lee Kok Cheong
 Murder of Liang Shan Shan
 Murder of Lim Lee Tin
 Murder of Mirza Abdul Halim
 Murder of Nonoi
 Murder of Piang Ngaih Don
 Murder of Seow Kim Choo
 Murder of Sulaiman bin Hashim
 Murder of T. Maniam
 Murders of Tay Chow Lyang and Tony Tan Poh Chuan
 Murphy Wiredu
 Murray McLean (ambassador)
 Murtabak
 Murugan Idli Shop
 Musa Hassan
 Musang Berjanggut
 Musang King
 Musashi Okuyama
 Museum Planning Area
 Music Voyager
 Music of Singapore
 Musim Mas
 Mustafa Centre
 Mustaqim Manzur
 Muvee Technologies
 My Beloved Dearest
 My Buddy (TV series)
 My Darling (album)
 My Desired Happiness
 My Destiny (Malaysian TV series)
 My Destiny (Philippine TV series)
 My Dog Dou Dou
 My First School
 My Friends from Afar
 My Ghost Partner
 My Grandson, the Doctor
 My Guardian Angels
 My Kampong Days
 My Love Sinema
 My Lucky Charm
 My Magic
 My Mighty-in-Laws
 My Paper
 My Queenstown Heritage Trail
 My School Daze
 My Secret App
 My Story, Your Song
 My Teacher Is a Thug
 MyRepublic
 Myanmar at the 2010 Summer Youth Olympics
 Myanmar at the 2015 Southeast Asian Games
 Mycalesis mineus
 Mycalesis orseis
 Mycalesis perseoides
 Mycalesis perseus
 Mycalesis rama
 Mycalesis visala
 Myint Thein
 Mylene Ong
 Myra Lee (diver)
 Myristica iners
 Myself World Tour

N

 N. Ganesan
 N. R. Narayana Murthy
 NC 16 (By2)
 NCS Group
 NETS (company)
 NEWater
 NRG Engineering
 NS Square
 NTU Centre for Contemporary Art Singapore
 NTU Music Express
 NTUC Downtown East
 NTUC FairPrice
 NUS Faculty of Law
 NUS High School of Math and Science
 NUS Museum
 NUS Muslim Society
 NUS Press
 NUS university professor
 NUSSU Rag and Flag
 Na Govindasamy
 Nacaduba berenice
 Nacaduba calauria
 Nacaduba pavana
 Nadia Ahmad Samdin
 Nadine Joy Nathan
 Nadine Social Robot
 Nagore Durgha, Singapore
 Nairobi International Convention on the Removal of Wrecks
 Nalla Tan
 Nam-Hai Chua
 Names of Singapore
 Namibia at the 2010 Summer Youth Olympics
 Namiko Chan Takahashi
 Nan Chiau High School
 Nan Chiau Jit Pao
 Nan Hua High School
 Nancy Lam
 Nancy Yuen (singer)
 Nanda Lin Kyaw Chit
 Nandita Banna
 Nanguan music
 Nanny Daddy
 Nanyang Academy of Fine Arts
 Nanyang Chinese Orchestra
 Nanyang Concert Band
 Nanyang Crescent MRT station
 Nanyang Gateway MRT station
 Nanyang Girls' High School
 Nanyang Junior College
 Nanyang Polytechnic
 Nanyang Siang Pau
 Nanyang Siang Pau (Singapore)
 Nanyang Style
 Nanyang Technological University
 Nanyang Technological University Libraries
 Nanyang University
 Naofumi Tanaka
 Naoki Kuriyama
 Naoki Naruo
 Naoya Kudo
 Naoya Shibamura
 Napier MRT station
 Napier Road, Singapore
 Naqiuddin Eunos
 Naraina Pillai
 Narelle Kheng
 Naruki Takahashi
 Naruphol Ar-romsawa
 Nas Daily
 Nashrul Amin
 Nasi goreng
 Nasi lemak
 Nasib Si Labu Labi
 Nasir Jalil
 Nasir P. Ramlee
 Nat Ho
 Natalie Hennedige
 Natalie Ong
 Nathan Hartono
 National Advisory Committee on SARS and Public Health
 National Aerated Water Company Factory
 National Archives of Singapore
 National Arts Council, Singapore
 National Basketball League (Singapore)
 National Biodiversity Centre (Singapore)
 National Cadet Corps (Singapore)
 National Cancer Centre Singapore
 National Centre for Infectious Diseases
 National Civil Defence Cadet Corps
 National Climate Change Secretariat
 National Council of Churches of Singapore
 National Council of Social Service
 National Council on Problem Gambling (Singapore)
 National Courtesy Campaign (Singapore)
 National Day (Singapore)
 National Dental Centre Singapore
 National Design Centre
 National Environment Agency
 National Football Academy (Singapore)
 National Gallery Singapore
 National Grid Office
 National Healthcare Group
 National Heart Centre Singapore
 National Heritage Board (Singapore)
 National Institute of Education
 National Jobs Council of Singapore
 National Junior College
 National Kidney Foundation Singapore
 National Kidney Foundation Singapore scandal
 National Library Board
 National Library, Singapore
 National Museum of Singapore
 National Neuroscience Institute
 National Night
 National Orchid Garden
 National Parks Board
 National Physical Fitness Award
 National Pledge (Singapore)
 National Police Cadet Corps
 National Registration Identity Card
 National Robotics Competition (Singapore)
 National Sailing Centre
 National Security Coordination Secretariat
 National Skin Centre
 National Solidarity Party (Singapore)
 National Stadium, Singapore
 National Theatre, Singapore
 National Trades Union Congress
 National Treasures of Singapore
 National University Cancer Institute, Singapore
 National University Centre for Oral Health, Singapore
 National University Health System
 National University Heart Centre, Singapore
 National University Hospital
 National University of Singapore
 National Youth Council Singapore
 National monuments of Singapore
 National service in Singapore
 National symbols of Singapore
 Nature Law
 Nature Society (Singapore)
 Nature reserves in Singapore
 Naufal Azman
 Naufal Ilham
 Naumi Hospitality
 Nauru at the 2010 Summer Youth Olympics
 Naval Diving Unit (Singapore)
 Navin Param
 Navroji Mistri
 Nayan Mongia
 Nazeri Lajim
 Nazhiim Harman
 Nazri Nasir
 Nazri Sabri
 Nazrul Nazari
 Nebojsa Vukosavljevic
 Ned Holiday
 Nee Soon Central Single Member Constituency
 Nee Soon Constituency
 Nee Soon East Single Member Constituency
 Nee Soon Group Representation Constituency
 Nee Soon South Single Member Constituency
 Need for Speed: World
 Neeraj Khemlani
 Neeya (TV series)
 Neezam Aziz
 Nei Xue Tang Museum
 Neighbourhood Chef 2
 Neighbourhood Renewal Programme
 Neighbourhood police centre
 Neil Humphreys
 Neil Karnik
 Neil Road
 Neila Sathyalingam
 Neisha Pratt
 Nekromantik
 Nelson Chia
 Nelson Kwei
 Nelson Mariano
 Nelson San Martín
 Nenad Baćina
 Neo Ao Tiew
 Neo Beng Siang
 Neo Chwee Kok
 Neo Jie Shi
 Neo Kian Hong
 Neo Swee Lin
 Neocheritra amrita
 Neon Yang
 Nepal at the 2010 Summer Youth Olympics
 Nepalese in Singapore
 Nepalis in Singapore
 Neptis columella
 Neptis harita
 Neptis hylas
 Neptune Orient Lines
 Net neutrality in Singapore
 NetLink Trust
 Netball Singapore
 Netball Singapore Nations Cup
 Netball Super League (Singapore)
 Netball at the 2015 Southeast Asian Games
 Netball in Singapore
 Netherlands Antilles at the 2010 Summer Youth Olympics
 Netherlands at the 2010 Summer Youth Olympics
 Netherlands–Singapore relations
 Netrust
 New Asia Republic
 New Beginnings (2010 TV series)
 New Bridge Road
 New Creation Church
 New Friend
 New Majestic Hotel
 New Opera Singapore
 New Paper Big Walk
 New Recording 47
 New Town Secondary School
 New World Amusement Park
 New Year's Day
 New Zealand at the 2010 Summer Youth Olympics
 New Zealand–Singapore relations
 New towns of Singapore
 Newspaper and Printing Presses Act
 NewspaperSG
 Newton Food Centre
 Newton MRT station
 Newton N. Minow
 Newton Suites
 Newton railway station, Singapore
 Newton, Singapore
 Nex, Singapore
 Nexif Energy
 Next Singaporean general election
 Nexus International School Singapore
 Ng Beng Kee
 Ng Chee Khern
 Ng Chee Meng
 Ng Chee Peng
 Ng Chee Yang
 Ng Chin-Keong
 Ng Eng Hen
 Ng Eng Teng
 Ng Gim Choo
 Ng Han Bin
 Ng Hui
 Ng Jui Ping
 Ng Liang Chiang
 Ng Ling Ling
 Ng Ming Wei
 Ng Pock Too
 Ng Ser Miang
 Ng Soo Hin murders
 Ng Teng Fong
 Ng Teng Fong General Hospital
 Ng Woon Lam
 Ng Xuan Hui
 Ng Yat Chung
 Ng Yi Sheng
 Ng Yu Zhi
 Ng Yue Meng
 Ngee Ann City
 Ngee Ann Cultural Centre
 Ngee Ann Kongsi
 Ngee Ann Polytechnic
 Ngee Ann Secondary School
 Ngiam Tee Liang
 Ngo hiang
 Nguyễn Văn Lộc
 Nibong LRT station
 Nicaragua at the 2010 Summer Youth Olympics
 Nicholas Chia
 Nicholas Lee
 Nicholas Tan
 Nicholle Toh
 Nick Aplin
 Nick Jr. (Southeast Asian TV channel)
 Nick Leeson
 Nick Shen
 Nick Teo
 Nickelodeon (Asian TV channel)
 Nickson Fong
 Nicky Melvin Singh
 Nicky Moey
 Nicodeme Boucher
 Nicole Lai
 Nicole Seah
 Nicolette Teo
 Nicoll Highway
 Nicoll Highway MRT station
 Nicoll Highway collapse
 Nicolás Vélez
 Nigel Callaghan
 Nigel Vanu
 Niger at the 2010 Summer Youth Olympics
 Nigeria at the 2010 Summer Youth Olympics
 Night Owl Cinematics
 Night Safari, Singapore
 Nijangal
 Nikesh Singh Sidhu
 Niklas Sandberg (footballer, born 1978)
 Niko Tokić
 Nikola Rak
 Nilam (film)
 Ning Cai (writer)
 Ninja Van
 Nitish Jain
 Niweat Siriwong
 No Limits (Singaporean TV series)
 No More Panic
 No Problem (Fann Wong album)
 No U-turn syndrome
 No. 13 – A Dancing Van Gogh
 No. 89757
 Noah Yap
 Noble Group
 Nobody's Child (2004 film)
 Noeleen Heyzer
 Noh Alam Shah
 Noh Rahman
 Nominated Member of Parliament
 Nomura Holdings
 Non-constituency Member of Parliament
 NonStop Games
 Noor Aishah Mohammad Salim
 Noor Akid Nordin
 Noor Ariff
 Noor Azhar Hamid
 Noorhaqmal Mohamed Noor
 Nor Azli Yusoff
 Nora Ariffin
 Nora Samosir
 Norah Chambers
 Norasharee Gous
 Nordine Talhi
 Norhalis Shafik
 Norian Mai
 Norihiro Kawakami
 Norikazu Murakami
 Norio Takahashi
 Norman Gonzales
 Norodom Sihanouk
 North Bridge Road
 North East Community Development Council
 North East MRT line
 North Korea at the 2010 Summer Youth Olympics
 North Korean Slaves
 North Korea–Singapore relations
 North Region, Singapore
 North View Secondary School
 North Vista Secondary School
 North West Community Development Council
 North-East Region, Singapore
 North-Eastern Islands
 Northbrooks Secondary School
 Northlight School
 Northpoint City
 Northstar Group
 North–South Corridor, Singapore
 North–South MRT line
 Norton Rose Fulbright
 Norway at the 2010 Summer Youth Olympics
 Notocrypta paralysos
 Novartis Institute for Tropical Diseases
 Novena Church
 Novena Global Lifecare
 Novena MRT station
 Novena, Singapore
 Nujum Pa' Belalang
 Number 1 (2020 film)
 Numoni
 Nur Adam Abdullah
 Nur Atikah Nabilah
 Nur Luqman
 Nur Ridho
 Nuraliah Norasid
 Nuraliza Osman
 Nurhilmi Jasni
 Nurshahidah Roslie
 Nurshamil Abd Ghani
 Nurul Suhaila
 Nurullah Hussein
 Nurzuhairah Yazid
 Nyctixalus pictus
 Nüyou

O

 O Singapore!: Stories in Celebration
 O Thiam Chin
 O' Coffee Club
 O. J. Obatola
 OB marker
 OBike
 OCBC Bank
 OCBC Centre
 OCBC Cycle Singapore
 OCBC NISP
 OCBC Singapore Continental Cycling Team
 OCBC Wing Hang Bank
 OK Man
 OMC Shipping
 ONE 156
 ONE 157
 ONE 158
 ONE 159
 ONE 160
 ONE 161
 ONE 162
 ONE 163
 ONE 164
 ONE Championship
 ONE Championship Rankings
 ONE Fight Night 10
 ONE Fight Night 6
 ONE Fight Night 7
 ONE Fight Night 8
 ONE Friday Fights 1
 ONE Friday Fights 2
 ONE Friday Fights 3
 ONE on Prime Video 1
 ONE on Prime Video 2
 ONE on Prime Video 3
 ONE on Prime Video 4
 ONE on Prime Video 5
 ONE: Bad Blood
 ONE: Full Circle
 ONE: Heavy Hitters
 ONE: Lights Out
 ONE: Only the Brave
 ONE: Winter Warriors
 ONE: Winter Warriors II
 ONE: X
 ONG & ONG
 OUE Downtown
 Oakwell Engineering Ltd v Enernorth Industries Inc
 Oasia Hotel
 Oasia Hotel Downtown
 Oasis LRT station
 Oasis Terraces
 Obadin Aikhena
 Objectifs
 Ocean Butterflies
 Ocean Financial Centre
 October Cherries
 Odd L. Fosseidbråten
 Oddbods
 Odette (restaurant)
 Odex
 Odex's actions against file-sharing
 Odion Obadin
 Odontoptilum angulata
 Oei Hong Leong
 Oei Tiong Ham
 Offence of scandalizing the court in Singapore
 Officer Cadet School (Singapore)
 Officer candidate school
 Official Monetary and Financial Institutions Forum
 Oh Carol!
 Oh Chwee Hock
 Oh Ddog-yi
 Oh In-kyun
 Oh Joon
 Oh!K
 Ohannes Kurkdjian
 Oil industry in Singapore
 Okto
 Olam International
 Old Airport Road, Singapore
 Old Chang Kee
 Old Hill Street Police Station
 Old Ministry of Labour Building
 Old National Library Building
 Old Police Academy, Singapore
 Old Supreme Court Building, Singapore
 Old Tao Nan School
 Old Thong Chai Medical Institution
 OldTown White Coffee
 Olga Syahputra
 Oli 96.8FM
 Oligodon signatus
 Olimpiu Di Luppi
 Olinda Cho
 Olive-backed sunbird
 Oliver Puflett
 Olivia Choong
 Olivia Lum
 Olivia Ong
 Oman at the 2010 Summer Youth Olympics
 Omar Hilale
 Omni United
 Omni-Theatre, Science Centre Singapore
 On Cheong Jewellery
 On Shaw Ming
 On the Fringe (1988 TV series)
 On the Fringe (2011 TV series)
 On the Red Dot
 One (Southeast Asian TV channel)
 One George Street
 One Great Step
 One Hundred Years' History of the Chinese in Singapore
 One Last Dance (2006 film)
 One Leg Kicking
 One Marina Boulevard
 One More Chance (2005 Singaporean film)
 One Raffles Link
 One Raffles Place
 One Raffles Quay
 One Shenton Way
 One-north
 One-north MRT station
 Ong Ah Chuan v Public Prosecutor
 Ong Ai Leng
 Ong Beng Seng
 Ong Chit Chung
 Ong Eng Guan
 Ong Keng Sen
 Ong Keng Yong
 Ong Kiat Guan
 Ong Kim Seng
 Ong Pang Boon
 Ong Poh Lim
 Ong Schan Tchow
 Ong Shunmugam
 Ong Soh Khim
 Ong Su Mann
 Ong Teck Chin
 Ong Teng Cheong
 Ong Ye Kung
 Ong Yu En
 Ooi Boon Ewe
 Oon Chiew Seng
 Oon Jin Gee
 Oon Jin Teik
 Oon Shu An
 Operation Blue Angel
 Operation Coldstore
 Operation Jaywick
 Operation Mailfist
 Operation Matador (1941)
 Operation Nightingale
 Operation Rimau
 Operation Spectrum
 Operation Thunderstorm
 Operation Tiderace
 Ophir Road
 Optional Protocol on the Involvement of Children in Armed Conflict
 Optional Protocol on the Sale of Children, Child Prostitution and Child Pornography
 Optional Protocol to the Convention on the Safety of United Nations and Associated Personnel
 Optometry in Singapore
 Optus
 Or Else, the Lightning God & Other Stories
 OrSiSo
 Orang Laut
 Orang Seletar
 Orang Seletar language
 Orang bunian
 Orange Star
 Orchard Boulevard
 Orchard Boulevard MRT station
 Orchard Central
 Orchard Gateway
 Orchard MRT station
 Orchard Point
 Orchard Road
 Orchard Road Market
 Orchard Road Presbyterian Church
 Orchard Towers
 Orchard Towers double murders
 Orchestra of the Music Makers
 Orchid Park Secondary School
 Ord Bridge
 Oreocryptophis
 Orfeur Cavenagh
 Organisation of the Government of Singapore
 Organised Crime Act 2015
 Organised crime in Singapore
 Oriental Hotel murder
 Orkestra Melayu Singapura
 Orsotriaena medus
 Orthaga bipartalis
 Orthaga chionalis
 Orthetrum testaceum
 Osagie Ederaro
 Osbert de Rozario
 Osim International
 Osteochilus melanopleura
 Oswind Suriya
 Otak-otak
 Othman Wok
 Our Rice House
 Our Singapore Conversation
 Our Tampines Hub
 Out to Win (TV series)
 Outer Ring Road System
 Outer Space Treaty
 Outline of Singapore
 Outram Community Hospital
 Outram Park MRT station
 Outram Secondary School
 Outram, Singapore
 Outward Bound Singapore
 Overseas Minangkabau
 Overseas Singaporean
 Overseas Trust Bank
 Ovidia Yu
 Oyster omelette

P

 P. C. Suppiah
 P. N. Sivaji
 P. N. Suganthan
 P. Ramlee
 P. Veerasenan
 P.I. (TV series)
 PAP Community Foundation
 PAP–UMNO relations
 PCMag
 PHUNK
 POSB Bank
 PSA International
 PSB Academy
 Pablo Rodríguez (footballer, born 1985)
 Pachliopta aristolochiae
 Pacific Century Regional Developments
 Pacific Economic Cooperation Council
 Pacific International Lines
 Pacita Abad
 Pacnet
 Padang, Singapore
 Paddy Boom
 Paddy Chew
 Padlet
 Page One (bookstore)
 Pagoda Street
 Paige Chua
 Painted chorus frog
 Pakistan at the 2009 Asian Youth Games
 Pakistan at the 2010 Summer Youth Olympics
 Pakistanis in Singapore
 Pakistan–Singapore relations
 Pakorn Lam
 Paktor
 Palais Renaissance
 Palau at the 2010 Summer Youth Olympics
 Palelai Buddhist Temple
 Palestine at the 2010 Summer Youth Olympics
 Palm Beach Seafood
 Palm sugar
 Pam Oei
 Pamelyn Chee
 Pan Asia Logistics
 Pan Island Expressway
 Pan Lingling
 Pan Pacific Hotels and Resorts
 Pan Pacific Singapore Hotel
 Pan-Electric Industries
 Panama at the 2010 Summer Youth Olympics
 Pandan Gardens
 Pandan Primary School
 Pandan Reservoir
 Pandan Reservoir MRT station
 Pandan Strait
 Pang Kim Hin
 Pang Sheng Jun
 Pannir Selvam Pranthaman
 Pansing
 Pantages Hollywood Theatre
 Pantoporia hordonia
 Pantoporia paraka
 Pao leiurus
 Paper Rex
 Papilio clytia
 Papilio demoleus
 Papilio demolion
 Papilio iswara
 Papilio machaon
 Papilio memnon
 Papilio polytes
 Papilio prexaspes
 Papilionanthe Miss Joaquim
 Papua New Guinea at the 2010 Summer Youth Olympics
 Paradise (By2 album)
 Paradise Group Holdings
 Parag Dahiwal
 Paragon, Singapore
 Paraguay at the 2010 Summer Youth Olympics
 Parahya
 Parakysis longirostris
 Parameswara (king)
 Paramount Evil
 Parantica agleoides
 Parascorpaena bandanensis
 Parental Guidance (TV series)
 Pareronia hippia
 Pareronia valeria
 Paris Agreement
 Paris Convention for the Protection of Industrial Property
 Paris and Milan
 Park Chul-hyung
 Park Connector Network
 Park Hotel Group
 Park Kang-jin
 Park Tae-won (footballer)
 Park Yo-seb
 Parkroyal Collection Marina Bay, Singapore
 Parkroyal Collection Pickering
 Parkview Square
 Parkway East Hospital
 Parkway Pantai
 Parkway Parade
 Parliament House, Singapore
 Parliament of Singapore
 Partial Nuclear Test Ban Treaty
 Pasar malam
 Pasar pagi
 Pasi Jaakonsaari
 Pasir Gudang Corporation Stadium
 Pasir Laba Camp
 Pasir Laba Road
 Pasir Panjang
 Pasir Panjang Constituency
 Pasir Panjang Group Representation Constituency
 Pasir Panjang MRT station
 Pasir Panjang Pillbox
 Pasir Panjang railway station
 Pasir Ris
 Pasir Ris Bus Interchange
 Pasir Ris East MRT station
 Pasir Ris Elias Community Club
 Pasir Ris Group Representation Constituency
 Pasir Ris MRT station
 Pasir Ris Park
 Pasir Ris Public Library
 Pasir Ris Secondary School
 Pasir Ris Town Park
 Pasir Ris rail accident
 Pasir Ris–Punggol Group Representation Constituency
 Pasquale Pistorio
 Passion Made Possible
 Pastamania
 Pat Chan
 Patent Cooperation Treaty
 Pathlight School
 Pathman Matialakan
 Patisserie Fighting
 Patriarchal Exarchate in South-East Asia
 Patricia Eugenia Cárdenas Santa María
 Patricia L. Herbold
 Patricia Miang Lon Ng
 Patricia Mok
 Patrick Grove
 Patrick Hesse
 Patrick McKerron
 Patrick Paranjody
 Patrick Stanley Vaughan Heenan
 Patrick Tay
 Patrick Teoh
 Patrick Vallée
 Patrol (TV series)
 Paul Abisheganaden
 Paul Chua
 Paul Cunningham (footballer)
 Paul Lim
 Paul Madden (diplomat)
 Paul Masefield
 Paul Matsudaira
 Paul Tambyah
 Paul Tan (poet)
 Paul Thompson (ice hockey, born 1965)
 Paula Kinikinilau
 Paulin Mbaye
 Paulin Tay Straughan
 Pauline Ng (entrepreneur)
 Paulo Sérgio (footballer, born 1984)
 Paulyn Sun
 Pavilion, Singapore
 Pawnbrokers Act 2015
 PayNow
 Paya Lebar
 Paya Lebar Air Base
 Paya Lebar MRT station
 Paya Lebar Methodist Girls' School (Secondary)
 Paya Lebar Single Member Constituency
 Paya Lebar Viaduct
 Payment Services Act 2019
 Pe Khin
 Peace & Prosperity
 Peaceful betta
 Peanut sauce
 Pearl Bank Apartments
 Pearl's Hill
 Pearl's Hill City Park
 Pearry Reginald Teo
 Peck Seah Street
 Peculiar Chris
 Pedra Branca dispute
 Pedra Branca, Singapore
 Pedro Bortoluzo
 Pedro Henrique (footballer, born December 1992)
 Peh Chin Hua
 Pei Hwa Secondary School
 Pei Shan Lee
 Pei-yuan Chia
 Peirce Secondary School
 Pelophryne ingeri
 Pelopidas assamensis
 Pelopidas mathias
 Penal Code (Singapore)
 Pencak silat at the 2015 Southeast Asian Games
 Pendekar Bujang Lapok
 Pending LRT station
 Peng Kang Hill MRT station
 Peng Tsu Ann
 Peng Tsu Ying
 Peng Yee Lee
 Pengerang
 Peninsular Malaysian rain forests
 Penjuru Crescent
 Penny Low
 People Like Us (Singapore)
 People of the Pear Tree
 People's Action Party
 People's Association
 People's Front (Singapore)
 People's Liberal Democratic Party
 People's Movement to Stop Haze
 People's Park Centre
 People's Park Complex
 People's Park railway station
 People's Power Party (Singapore)
 Peoples Voice (Singapore)
 Per G. Schøyen
 Peranakan Museum
 Peranakan Place
 Peranakan cuisine
 Peranakans
 Percy McElwaine
 Percy Pennefather
 Peres (Brazilian footballer)
 Perfect Cut
 Permanent residency in Singapore
 Perry Lim
 Perry Ng
 Personal Data Protection Act 2012
 Personnel Command (Singapore Armed Forces)
 Perth (film)
 Pertubuhan Kebangsaan Melayu Singapura
 Peru at the 2010 Summer Youth Olympics
 Pesta Perdana
 Pet Lovers Centre
 Peter Anosike
 Peter Bennett (soccer)
 Peter Chong (karateka)
 Peter Cockcroft
 Peter Corthine
 Peter Gilchrist (billiards player)
 Peter Ho (chairman)
 Peter Kee Lin Ng
 Peter Lee (musician)
 Peter Lim
 Peter Lim Charity Cup
 Peter Moon (diplomat)
 Peter Ong
 Peter Politiek
 Peter Preiser
 Peter Senior
 Peter Tham
 Peter Tomko
 Peter Tripp (diplomat)
 Peter Whish-Wilson
 Petir LRT station
 Petrelaea dana
 PetroSeraya
 Phalanta phalantha
 Phan Wait Hong
 Phay Seng Whatt
 Phey Yew Kok
 Philip Jeyaretnam
 Philip Poh
 Philip Yeo
 Philippe Aw
 Philippines at the 1993 Southeast Asian Games
 Philippines at the 2010 Summer Youth Olympics
 Philippines at the 2015 Southeast Asian Games
 Philippines–Singapore relations
 PhillipCapital
 Phoenix LRT station
 Phoon Kok Kwang
 Photopectoralis aureus
 Phua Bah Lee
 Phua Chu Kang Pte Ltd
 Phua Chu Kang Sdn Bhd
 Phua Chu Kang The Movie
 Phua Kok Khoo
 Phyllis Eu Cheng Li
 Phyllis Quek
 Phyllocharis undulata
 Pickering Operations Complex
 Pie tee
 Pieris canidia
 Pierre Nlate
 Pierre Png
 Pig fallopian tubes
 Pig's organ soup
 Pilar Arlando
 Pillow Talk (Singaporean TV series)
 Pineapple tart
 Pingat Bakti Masyarakat
 Pingat Bakti Setia
 Pingat Berkebolehan
 Pingat Berkebolehan (Tentera)
 Pingat Gagah Perkasa
 Pingat Gagah Perkasa (Tentera)
 Pingat Jasa Gemilang
 Pingat Jasa Gemilang (Tentera)
 Pingat Keberanian
 Pingat Kehormatan
 Pingat Kepujian
 Pingat Penghargaan (Tentera)
 Pingat Pentadbiran Awam
 Pingat Pentadbiran Awam (Tentera)
 Pingat Perkhidmatan Operasi Home Team
 Pingat Polis Keberanian
 Pink Dot SG
 Pioneer Generation Package
 Pioneer MRT station
 Pioneer Mall
 Pioneer Secondary School
 Pioneer Sector
 Pioneer Single Member Constituency
 Pioneer, Singapore
 Pirates Plund-Arrr
 Pitipong Kuldilok
 Pixelmetrix
 Piya Tan
 Piyush Gupta
 Plague City: SARS in Toronto
 Planning Areas of Singapore
 Plantain squirrel
 Plastingia naga
 Plastique Kinetic Worms
 Platerodrilus ruficollis
 Platycerium coronarium
 Play World Tour
 Playware Studios
 Plaza Singapura
 Pleasure Factory
 Plug-in electric vehicles in Singapore
 Png Eng Huat
 Po-Shen Loh
 Poetic Justice (TV series)
 Poh Ern Shih Temple
 Poh Li San
 Poh Lip Meng
 Poh Seng Song
 Poh Siew Wah
 Poh Soo Kai
 Poh Yi Feng
 Point of Contact (novel)
 Point of Entry (TV series)
 Pointer (journal)
 Poland at the 2010 Summer Youth Olympics
 Police & Thief
 Police Cantonment Complex
 Police Coast Guard
 Police Intelligence Department
 Police K-9 Unit (Singapore)
 Police National Service Full-time Light Strike Force
 Police Tactical Unit (Singapore)
 Police Technology Department
 Political positions of Lee Kuan Yew
 Politics of Singapore
 Pollutant Standards Index
 Polycentric networks
 Polytremis lubricans
 Polyura schreiber
 Pongpisuth Pue-on
 Pontianak (film)
 Pooja Nansi
 Poon Yuen Chung
 Pop Aye
 Pop and Contemporary Fine Art
 Popiah
 Poppy Gilbert
 Popular Holdings
 Population White Paper
 Population planning in Singapore
 Pornsak Prajakwit
 Port of Singapore
 Portal:Singapore
 Portek
 Portrait of Home
 Portugal at the 2010 Summer Youth Olympics
 Postage stamps and postal history of Christmas Island
 Postage stamps and postal history of Malaysia
 Postage stamps and postal history of Singapore
 Postage stamps and postal history of the Straits Settlements
 Postal codes in Singapore
 Potanthus omaha
 Potanthus serina
 Potong Pasir
 Potong Pasir MRT station
 Potong Pasir Single Member Constituency
 Power 98 (radio station)
 Powerlifting Singapore
 Powerlifting at the 2015 ASEAN Para Games
 Powers of the president of Singapore
 Prabal Gurung
 Pradhana Vizha
 Pradhana Vizha 2014
 Pradit Taweechai
 Pragathi Guruprasad
 Prakash Kumar Pallathadka
 Prakash Raj (footballer)
 Pratapa deva
 Pravasi Express
 Pravasi Express Awards
 Praveen Linga
 Pravin Guanasagaran
 Pre-election day events of the 2006 Singaporean general election
 Pre-election day events of the 2011 Singaporean general election
 Pre-election day events of the 2015 Singaporean general election
 Pre-election day events of the 2020 Singaporean general election
 Precedent fact errors in Singapore law
 Precious Babes
 Precious Emuejeraye
 Precious Is the Night
 Precision Drill Squad (Singapore)
 Predrag Počuča
 Presbyterian Church in Singapore
 Presbyterian High School
 Preschool in Singapore
 President of Singapore
 President's Challenge
 President's Scholar
 President's Scout (Singapore Scout Association)
 Presidential Council for Minority Rights
 Presidential Elections Committee
 Presidential elections in Singapore
 Prevention of Human Trafficking Act 2015
 Priceless Wonder
 Prima Taste
 Prima Tower (Singapore)
 Primary School Leaving Examination
 Prime League
 Prime Minister of Singapore
 Prime Minister's Office (Singapore)
 Prime Supermarket
 Primetime News
 Prince Edward Road MRT station
 Princess House
 Prinsep Street Presbyterian Church
 Priscelia Chan
 Priscilla Shunmugam
 Pritam Singh (Singaporean politician)
 Private (rank)
 Private first class
 Pro-Am Singapore Basketball League
 ProGamer G500
 Procedural impropriety in Singapore administrative law
 Proclamation of Malaysia
 Proclamation of Singapore
 Prodikeys
 Programme for Rebuilding and Improving Existing Schools
 Progress Singapore Party
 Progressive Party (Singapore)
 Progressive wage
 Project Griffin
 Project Hope (Singapore)
 Project SuperStar
 Project SuperStar (season 1)
 Project SuperStar (season 2)
 Project SuperStar (season 3)
 Promax Awards
 Promenade MRT station
 Promote Mandarin Council
 Promotional Framework for Occupational Safety and Health Convention, 2006
 Proposed 2019 amendment to the Constitution of Malaysia
 Prosotas dubiosa
 Prosotas nora
 Prosperity (Singaporean TV series)
 Prostitution in Singapore
 Protection against Accidents (Dockers) Convention (Revised), 1932
 Protection from Harassment Act (Singapore)
 Protection from Online Falsehoods and Manipulation Act 2019
 Protection of Diplomats Convention
 Protective Security Command
 Protocol Bringing under International Control Drugs outside the Scope of the Convention of 13 July 1931 for Limiting the Manufacture and Regulating the Distribution of Narcotic Drugs
 Protocol III
 Protocol amending the Single Convention on Narcotic Drugs
 Protocol for the Suppression of Unlawful Acts against the Safety of Fixed Platforms Located on the Continental Shelf
 Protocol for the Suppression of Unlawful Acts of Violence at Airports
 Protocol to Prevent, Suppress and Punish Trafficking in Persons, Especially Women and Children
 Protocol to the Convention on International Interests in Mobile Equipment on Matters specific to Aircraft Equipment
 Provision Shop
 Provisional Admission Exercise
 Prudential plc
 Prunus polystachya
 Psammodynastes pictus
 Pseudobactricia
 Pseudocoladenia dan
 Pseudozizeeria maha
 Pterocarpus indicus
 Pu-Xian Min
 Public Prosecutor v Taw Cheng Kong
 Public Service Commission (Singapore)
 Public Transport Council
 Public Transport Security Command
 Public Utilities Board (Singapore)
 Public Warning System (Singapore)
 Public buses of Singapore
 Public demonstrations in Singapore
 Public holidays in Singapore
 Public housing in Singapore
 Puerto Rico at the 2010 Summer Youth Olympics
 Pug Jelly
 Pulau Anak Bukom
 Pulau Biola
 Pulau Brani
 Pulau Bukom
 Pulau Busing
 Pulau Hantu
 Pulau Jong
 Pulau Merambong
 Pulau Palawan
 Pulau Pawai
 Pulau Pisang Lighthouse
 Pulau Saigon
 Pulau Sajahat
 Pulau Samulun
 Pulau Sarimbun
 Pulau Satumu
 Pulau Sekudu
 Pulau Seletar
 Pulau Semakau
 Pulau Senang
 Pulau Seringat
 Pulau Sudong
 Pulau Tekong
 Pulau Tekong Reservoir
 Pulau Tekukor
 Pulau Ubin
 Pulau Ubin Recreation Area
 Pulchrana baramica
 Pulchrana laterimaculata
 Puma Energy
 Punch Coomaraswamy
 Punggol
 Punggol Coast MRT station
 Punggol East Single Member Constituency
 Punggol Field murder
 Punggol LRT line
 Punggol MRT/LRT station
 Punggol Park
 Punggol Plaza
 Punggol Point LRT station
 Punggol Point Park
 Punggol Regional Library
 Punggol Single Member Constituency
 Punggol Temporary Bus Interchange
 Punggol Watertown
 Punggol Waterway Park
 Punggol West Single Member Constituency
 Punggol Zoo
 Punggol–Tampines Constituency
 Puntigrus partipentazona
 Puravalan Narayanasamy
 Puteri Gunong Ledang (film)
 Putu piring
 Putugal
 Puvan Raj Sivalingam
 Pyralis manihotalis
 Pétanque at the 2015 Southeast Asian Games

Q

 Qaboos bin Said
 Qantas Flight 32
 Qatar at the 2010 Summer Youth Olympics
 Qayyum Raishyan
 Qi Qi (host)
 Qi Yuwu
 Qian Hu Corporation
 Qingjian Realty
 Qiu Li
 Qiyun Woo
 Qoo10
 Quadria Capital
 Quah Chin Lai
 Quah Jing Wen
 Quah Kim Lye
 Quah Kim Song
 Quah Ting Wen
 Quah Zheng Wen
 Quan Heng
 Quan Yi Fong
 Quantula striata
 Quarterly Literary Review Singapore
 Queen Elizabeth Walk
 Queen Street, Singapore
 Queen's Scholar (British Malaya and Singapore)
 Queenstown Constituency
 Queenstown MRT station
 Queenstown Public Library
 Queenstown Secondary School
 Queenstown Stadium
 Queenstown, Singapore
 Queensway Base
 Queensway Secondary School
 Queensway Shopping Centre
 Quek Leng Chan
 Quek Swee Hwa
 Quentin Loh
 Qui-Lim Choo

R

 R Aaravin
 R. Sasikumar
 R. Vengadasalam
 RAAF Base Pearce
 RAF Amoy Quee
 RAF Changi
 RAF Chia Keng
 RAF Gombak
 RAF Jurong
 RAF Kallang
 RAF Seletar
 RAF Sembawang
 RAF Tengah
 REACH (Singapore)
 RHB Bank
 RHB-The Straits Times National Spelling Championship
 RRJ Capital
 RSAF Black Knights
 RSS Centurion
 RSS Courageous
 RSS Endeavour (210)
 RSS Endurance
 RSS Endurance (207)
 RSS Endurance (L201)
 RSS Excellence (L202)
 RSS Formidable
 RSS Intrepid
 RSS Intrepid (L203)
 RSS Invincible
 RSS Jupiter (M101)
 RSS Mercury (M102)
 RSS Panglima
 RSS Perseverance (L206)
 RSS Persistence (209)
 RSS Persistence (L205)
 RSS Resolution (208)
 RSS Resolution (L204)
 RSS Singapura
 RSS Stalwart
 RSS Steadfast
 RSS Supreme
 RSS Tenacious
 RSS Valiant
 RSS Valour
 RSS Vengeance
 RSS Victory
 RSS Vigilance
 RSS Vigour
 Race Across the World (series 1)
 Race Wong
 Race in Singapore
 Race to the Center of the Earth
 Rachad Ahmed Saleh Farah
 Rachana jalindra
 Rachel Heng
 Rachel K (company)
 Rachel Kum
 Rachel Ong
 Rachel Tseng
 Rachel Wahba
 Rachel Yang
 Rachid Lajane
 Racial Harmony Day
 Radiant Logic
 Radin Mas
 Radin Mas Single Member Constituency
 Radio in Singapore
 Radojko Avramović
 Raeburn Park School
 Raeesah Khan
 Rafael Ramazotti
 Raffles City Chongqing
 Raffles City Convention Centre
 Raffles City Hangzhou
 Raffles City Shanghai
 Raffles City Shopping Centre
 Raffles City Singapore
 Raffles City Tower
 Raffles Cup
 Raffles Design Institute
 Raffles Girls' School (Secondary)
 Raffles Holdings
 Raffles Hospital
 Raffles Hotel
 Raffles Hotels & Resorts
 Raffles House
 Raffles Institution
 Raffles Junior College
 Raffles Leadership Centre
 Raffles Lighthouse
 Raffles Medical Group
 Raffles Place
 Raffles Place MRT station
 Raffles Place Park
 Raffles' banded langur
 Raffles's Landing Site
 Rafi Ali
 Rafik Mansour
 Ragasiyam (season 2)
 Raghavendran Rajasekaran
 Rahayu Mahzam
 Rahimah Rahim (singer, born 1955)
 Rahimah Rahim (singer, born 1992)
 Raihan Rahman
 Rail transport in Singapore
 Rainbow Centre
 Raintree Pictures
 Rais Abin
 Raising Arcadia
 Rajah & Tann
 Rajeev Suri
 Rajesh Sreenivasan
 Ram Shanker
 Ramen Teh
 Ramli Sarip
 Ramon Tikaram
 Ranggung LRT station
 Rangsan Viwatchaichok
 Ranjini (actress)
 Ranjith Pathegama Gamage
 Raoul Suhaimi
 Rapala dieneces
 Rapala iarbus
 Rapala manea
 Rapala pheretima
 Rapala suffusa
 Rapala varuna
 Raphael R. Samuel
 Rasaq Akeem
 Rasbora cephalotaenia
 Rashaad Singleton
 Raspreet Sandhu
 Rastislav Beličák
 Ratan Tata
 Rathi Menon
 Raudhah Kamis
 Rave Republic
 Ravenmark: Scourge of Estellion
 Ravinder Singh (general)
 Rayil Sneham (season 3)
 Raymond LeRoy Archer
 Raymond Lim
 Raymond Zage
 Rayson Tan
 Razaleigh Khalik
 Razali Alias
 Razali Rashid
 Razali Saad
 Razer Inc.
 Razif Onn
 Re Fong Thin Choo
 Re Shankar Alan s/o Anant Kulkarni
 Reach for the Skies
 Read Bridge
 Rebecca Chua
 Rebecca Lim
 Reclining Figure 1938
 Recognition of same-sex unions in Singapore
 Recording Industry Association Singapore
 Red Dot Payment
 Red Dot United
 Red Dragonflies
 Red Ensign of Singapore
 Red by HBO
 Red envelope
 Red giant flying squirrel
 Red peach cake
 Red spiny rat
 Red-cheeked flying squirrel
 RedDoorz
 Redhill MRT station
 Rediffusion Singapore
 Redzwan Atan
 Reebonz
 Refash
 Reflections at Bukit Chandu
 Reflections at Keppel Bay
 Reform Party (Singapore)
 Regent Alfred John Bidwell
 Reggie Verghese
 Regimental police
 Regimental sergeant major
 Regina Ip
 Reginaldo Estevao
 Regional Comprehensive Economic Partnership
 Regional centre (Singapore)
 Regions of Singapore
 Registry of Marriages
 Relevant and irrelevant considerations in Singapore administrative law
 Religion in Singapore
 Religious Rehabilitation Group (Singapore)
 Religious goods store
 Remaking Singapore Committee
 Remedies in Singapore administrative law
 Remedies in Singapore constitutional law
 Remelana jangala
 Remember Chek Jawa
 Remisier
 Remy Ong
 Ren Ci Hospital
 Ren Ishihara
 Renato Martino
 Renault Formula One crash controversy
 Rendang
 Rendezvous Hotel Singapore
 Rene Komar
 Renjong LRT station
 Rennis Ponniah
 Renshi Yamaguchi
 Reo Kunimoto
 Reo Nishiguchi
 Representative democracy in Singapore
 Republic Plaza (Singapore)
 Republic Polytechnic
 Republic of Singapore Air Force
 Republic of Singapore Navy
 Republic of the Congo at the 2010 Summer Youth Olympics
 Rescue 995
 Rescue Agreement
 Reserves of the Government of Singapore
 Resorts World Sentosa
 Responsible Research
 Restaurant André
 Restroom Association
 Results of the 1963 Singaporean general election
 Reticulated python
 Reuben Kee
 Reunion Dinner (TV series)
 Reunion Dinner (film)
 Revenge of the Mummy
 Revenge of the Pontianak
 Revenue stamps of Singapore
 Revere Bell
 Rex Cinemas Mackenzie
 Rex Goh
 Rex International Holding
 Rex Shelley
 Reza Rezaeimanesh
 Reza Torabian
 Rezal Hassan
 Rezza Gaznavi
 Rezza Rezky
 Rhabdophis rhodomelas
 Rhapsody in Blue (TV series)
 Rheeya Doshi
 Rhema Obed
 Rhubarb Le Restaurant
 Rhynchostylis retusa
 Rhysh Roshan Rai
 Rhythm of Life (TV series)
 Ria 89.7FM
 Riau-Lingga Sultanate
 Ribiyanda Saswadimata
 Ricardo Sendra
 Rice Rhapsody
 Rice cake
 Rich Franklin
 Rich People Problems
 Richard Bok
 Richard Eric Holttum
 Richard Eu
 Richard F. Kneip
 Richard Fortin (cricketer)
 Richard H. Donald
 Richard Hu
 Richard James Wilkinson
 Richard K. Guy
 Richard Kiliani
 Richard Low
 Richard Olaf Winstedt
 Richard Ong
 Richard Pyman
 Richard Schoon
 Richard Sykes (microbiologist)
 Richard Tardy
 Richard Woolcott
 Richie Koh
 Ricky Waddell
 Ricky Yang
 Rico Mascariñas
 Ridhuan Barudin
 Ridhuan Muhammad
 Ridhwan Fikri
 Ridhwan Jamaludin
 Ridhwan Osman
 Ridley's leaf-nosed bat
 Ridzuan Abdunloh
 Ridzuan Fatah Hasan
 Right Frequency
 Right Frequency II
 Right of Association (Agriculture) Convention
 Right to Organise and Collective Bargaining Convention, 1949
 Riku Moriyasu
 Riky Widianto
 Rima Melati Adams
 Ring Roads in Singapore
 Rio Sakuma
 Rion Taki
 Ris Low
 Rishi Kumaar
 Rivaldo Costa
 River Huang
 River Valley Constituency
 River Valley High School attack
 River Valley High School, Singapore
 River Valley, Singapore
 River Wonders
 Riverside Secondary School (Singapore)
 Rivervale, Singapore
 Riviera MRT/LRT station
 Rizal Rahman
 Road names in Singapore
 Road signs in Singapore
 Roanne Ho
 Robbie Servais
 Robert A. Brown
 Robert Alberts
 Robert Alviž
 Robert Black (colonial administrator)
 Robert Brooke-Popham
 Robert Carr Woods
 Robert Chandran
 Robert Chua
 Robert D. Orr
 Robert Deng
 Robert Eziakor
 Robert Fullerton
 Robert Ho (sailor)
 Robert Hughes (actor)
 Robert Ibbetson
 Robert Lim
 Robert M. Solomon
 Robert Mugabe
 Robert Ng
 Robert Page (soldier)
 Robert Peel (judge)
 Robert Peirce (engineer)
 Robert Peričić
 Robert Yeo
 Roberto Camarasa
 Robertson Quay
 Robin Chan (soccer)
 Robin Loh
 Robin Tamang
 Robinson 77
 Robinson Road, Singapore
 Robinsons Department Stores Online
 Rochor
 Rochor Centre
 Rochor MRT station
 Rochor River
 Rochore Constituency
 Rock Entertainment
 Rocky Selvarajoo
 Rod David
 Rod Grizzard
 Roderick Lim
 Rodrigo Tosi
 Rodyk & Davidson
 Roger Kool
 Rohan Gunaratna
 Rohan Rangarajan
 Rojak
 Roland Braddell
 Roland Eng
 Roland Pearce
 Roland Tan
 Roland Tay
 Rolex Masters
 Rolex watch murder
 Roman Catholic Archdiocese of Singapore
 Romance de Amour
 Romania at the 2010 Summer Youth Olympics
 Romantic Delicacies
 Romeo Tan
 Ron Sim
 Ronald MacPherson
 Ronald Oxburgh, Baron Oxburgh
 Ronald Susilo
 Ronin (band)
 Ronnie Tay
 Rosalie Chiang
 Rosanne Wong
 Rosefin rasbora
 Roshni Kaur Soin
 Rosman Sulaiman
 Rosnani Azman
 Ross Butler (actor)
 Ross McKenzie
 Roti canai
 Roti jala
 Roti john
 Roti tissue
 Rotterdam Convention
 Rouge (TV series)
 Rowing at the 2010 Summer Youth Olympics
 Rowing at the 2010 Summer Youth Olympics – Boys' pair
 Rowing at the 2010 Summer Youth Olympics – Boys' single sculls
 Rowing at the 2010 Summer Youth Olympics – Girls' pair
 Rowing at the 2010 Summer Youth Olympics – Girls' single sculls
 Rowing at the 2015 Southeast Asian Games
 Roy Chan
 Roy Henry Bowyer-Yin
 Roy Hobbs (tennis)
 Roy Li
 Roy Ngerng
 Roy O'Donovan
 Roy Sharma
 Roya Rahmani
 Royal Albatross (ship)
 Royal Malay Regiment
 Royston Tan
 Royston Wee
 Rubbers (film)
 Ruben Pang
 Ruby Theatre (Singapore)
 Rudra (band)
 Rudy Khairullah
 Rudy Mosbergen
 Rugby sevens at the 2015 Southeast Asian Games
 Rugby sevens at the 2015 Southeast Asian Games – Men's tournament
 Rugby sevens at the 2015 Southeast Asian Games – Women's tournament
 Rugby union in Singapore
 Ruhaizad Ismail
 Rui En
 Rui En vol. 01
 Rui Kumada
 Rule of law doctrine in Singapore
 Rumbia LRT station
 Run Run Shaw
 Runme Shaw
 Running Into The Sun
 Rural East Constituency
 Rural West Constituency
 Russel Wong
 Russell Lee (writer)
 Russell Ong
 Russia at the 2010 Summer Youth Olympics
 Russians in Singapore
 Russia–Singapore relations
 Rusyaidi Salime
 Ruzaini Zainal
 Rwanda at the 2010 Summer Youth Olympics
 Ryaan Sanizal
 Ryan Edwards (Australian soccer)
 Ryan Fante
 Ryan Lian
 Ryan Lo
 Ryan Ng
 Ryan Syaffiq
 Ryhan Stewart
 Ryo Kurihara
 Ryo Nakano
 Ryo Takahashi (footballer, born 2000)
 Ryohei Maeda
 Ryosuke Nagasawa
 Ryota Nakai
 Ryoya Taniguchi
 Ryuji Sueoka
 Ryuji Yamauchi
 Ryujiro Yamanaka
 Ryuta Hayashi
 Ryutaro Megumi
 Ryutaro Shibanoki
 Ryuya Mitsuzuka
 Ryuya Motoda
 Rıza Türmen

S

 S P Jain School of Global Management
 S Uthuman Ghani
 S chip
 S. Chandrasekaran
 S. Dhanabalan
 S. Iswaran
 S. Jaishankar
 S. Jayakumar (Singaporean politician)
 S. Jayaraman
 S. Jeyathurai
 S. R. Nathan
 S. Rajaratnam
 S. Rajaratnam School of International Studies
 S. Ramu
 S. Shamsuddin
 S. Subramani
 S.N.A.P.
 S.U.R.E. Campaign
 S2S (Japanese record label)
 S3 Asia MBA
 SAF Ammunition Command
 SAF Day Parade
 SAF Medical Corps
 SAF Medical Training Institute
 SAF Military Police Command
 SAF Volunteer Corps
 SAFRA National Service Association
 SAFTI Military Institute
 SAM at 8Q
 SAR 21
 SAR 80
 SARS conspiracy theory
 SATS (company)
 SATS Security Services
 SB1394
 SBS Transit
 SCDF Marine Division
 SDH Institute
 SEA Finals
 SEALNet
 SGAG
 SGH War Memorial
 SGInnovate
 SGSecure
 SGX Centre
 SIA Engineering Company
 SIA-NKF Dialysis Centre
 SIBOR
 SIM University
 SIMBEX
 SJI International School
 SLWH Pegasus
 SME Infocomm Resource Centre
 SME One Asia Awards
 SMMCore standard
 SMRT Active Route Map Information System
 SMRT Buses
 SMRT Corporation
 SMRT Taxis
 SMRT Trains
 SOLAS Convention
 SP Chemicals
 SP Group
 SPDR Gold Shares
 SPH Media Trust
 SPH MediaWorks
 SPOP Sing! (season 1)
 SPOP Wave!
 SPRING Singapore
 SR 88
 SS Anglia (1944)
 SS Delphine (1921)
 SS Empire Adur
 SS Katong
 SSPH Primus
 ST Aero FanTail
 ST Aero MAV-1
 ST Aerospace
 ST Aerospace A-4SU Super Skyhawk
 ST Aerospace Skyblade
 ST Engineering
 ST Kinetics
 ST Kinetics CPW
 ST Telemedia
 ST-1
 ST-2
 STCW Convention
 STET Homeland Security Services
 STK 40 AGL
 STK 40 GL
 STK 50MG
 STK SSW (firearm)
 STOMP (website)
 STPI - Creative Workshop & Gallery
 SUSS School of Law
 SYC Ensemble Singers
 Saad Janjua
 Saadiah (actress)
 Sabo (web series)
 Sachin Mylavarapu
 Sadin Smajović
 Safe in a Crazy World
 SafeEntry
 Safety on the Mass Rapid Transit (Singapore)
 Safirul Sulaiman
 Safti
 Safuwan Baharudin
 Sagi Karni
 Sago Lane
 Sago Street
 Sahffee Jubpre
 Sahil Suhaimi
 Said Zahari
 Saidi Shariff
 Saifuddin Nasution Ismail
 Saifullah Akbar
 Sailing at the 2009 Asian Youth Games
 Sailing at the 2010 Summer Youth Olympics
 Sailing at the 2010 Summer Youth Olympics – Boys' Byte CII
 Sailing at the 2010 Summer Youth Olympics – Boys' Techno 293
 Sailing at the 2010 Summer Youth Olympics – Girls' Byte CII
 Sailing at the 2010 Summer Youth Olympics – Girls' Techno 293
 Sailing at the 2015 ASEAN Para Games
 Sailing at the 2015 Southeast Asian Games
 Sailing at the 2015 Southeast Asian Games – 49er FX
 Sailing at the 2015 Southeast Asian Games – Men's 420
 Sailing at the 2015 Southeast Asian Games – Men's 470
 Sailing at the 2015 Southeast Asian Games – Men's Fleet Racing Keelboat
 Sailing at the 2015 Southeast Asian Games – Men's Laser Radial
 Sailing at the 2015 Southeast Asian Games – Men's Laser Standard
 Sailing at the 2015 Southeast Asian Games – Men's Match Racing Keelboat
 Sailing at the 2015 Southeast Asian Games – Men's Optimist
 Sailing at the 2015 Southeast Asian Games – Men's RS:X
 Sailing at the 2015 Southeast Asian Games – Men's Team Racing Laser Standard
 Sailing at the 2015 Southeast Asian Games – Team Racing Optimist
 Sailing at the 2015 Southeast Asian Games – Women's 420
 Sailing at the 2015 Southeast Asian Games – Women's 470
 Sailing at the 2015 Southeast Asian Games – Women's Fleet Racing Keelboat
 Sailing at the 2015 Southeast Asian Games – Women's Laser Radial
 Sailing at the 2015 Southeast Asian Games – Women's Match Racing Keelboat
 Sailing at the 2015 Southeast Asian Games – Women's Optimist
 Sailing at the 2015 Southeast Asian Games – Women's RS:X
 Sailing at the 2015 Southeast Asian Games – Women's Team Racing Laser Radial
 Sailing at the 2015 Southeast Asian Games – Women's Youth Laser Radial
 Saint Andrew's Junior College
 Saint Andrew's School, Singapore
 Saint Andrew's Secondary School
 Saint Andrew's Village
 Saint Anthony's Canossian Secondary School
 Saint George's Church, Singapore
 Saint Jack
 Saint Jack (film)
 Saint John's Island
 Saint Joseph's Church, Victoria Street
 Saint Joseph's Institution Military Band
 Saint Kitts and Nevis at the 2010 Summer Youth Olympics
 Saint Lucia at the 2010 Summer Youth Olympics
 Saint Patrick's School, Singapore
 Saint Pierre (restaurant)
 Saint Vincent and the Grenadines at the 2010 Summer Youth Olympics
 Sairento VR
 Saito Nagasaki
 Saiyidah Aisyah
 Saizeriya
 Sakae Sushi
 Saktiandi Supaat
 Sakya Muni Buddha Gaya Temple
 Salakau
 Sale of Shin Corporation to Temasek Holdings
 Salim Moin
 Salleh Japar
 Saloma
 Salvatore Pennacchio
 Salve the Goat...Iblis Exelsi
 Sam Goi
 Sam Harris (basketball)
 Sam Kee LRT station
 Sam Lo
 Sam Quek
 Sam See
 Sam Tan (politician)
 Samad Allapitchay
 Samad Marfavi
 Samanea (company)
 Samantha Yeo
 Samaritans of Singapore
 Sambal
 Sambal stingray
 Samoa at the 2010 Summer Youth Olympics
 Samosa
 Samson Gimson
 Samsui Women (TV series)
 Samsui women
 Samsung Hub (building)
 Samsung Ladies Masters
 Samudera LRT station
 Samuel Dunlop
 Samuel Dyer
 Samuel Falle
 Samuel Gan
 San Marino at the 2010 Summer Youth Olympics
 San Yu Adventist School
 Sana Gallery
 Sandcastle (film)
 Sanders Saurajen
 Sandi Tan
 Sandra Lee (dermatologist)
 Sandra Riley Tang
 Sandrasegaran Woodhull
 Sang Nila Utama
 Sangeet Paul Choudary
 Sangeetha Thanapal
 Sanjeev Sharma
 Sanjin Vrebac
 Sanny Dahlbeck
 Sanrawat Dechmitr
 Santha Bhaskar
 Santi Chaiyaphuak
 Sanusi Mahmood
 Sara Tan
 Sarah Cheng-De Winne
 Sarah Choo Jing
 Sarah Kinsley
 Sarah Paw
 Sarah Tan
 Saravana Bhavan
 Sardon Jubir
 Sarika Prasad
 Sarine (company)
 Sarkasi Said
 Sarong party girl
 Sarpino's Pizzeria
 Sashi Cheliah
 Sat Pal Khattar
 Satay
 Satay Club
 Satay bee hoon
 Satoshi Hida
 Satsuki Mori
 Satu Mattila-Budich
 Satyasagara
 Saudi Arabia at the 2010 Summer Youth Olympics
 Saudi Arabia–Singapore relations
 Saurabh Mittal
 Savannah Siew
 Save22
 Saw Phaik Hwa
 Saw Swee Hock
 Say Cheese (TV series)
 Sazali Salleh
 Saša Dreven
 Schefflera hullettii
 School bands in Singapore
 School of Science and Technology, Singapore
 School-based Science Practical Assessment for GCE 'O' Level in Singapore
 Science Centre Singapore
 Scoot
 Scorpion Orchid
 Scott Anthony Starr
 Scott D. Anthony
 Scott O'Donell
 Scott Wightman
 Scotts Road
 Scotts Shopping Centre
 Scouting and Guiding in Singapore
 Screen Singapore
 Scuba Diver AustralAsia
 Sculpture Square
 Sea Ltd
 Seabed Arms Control Treaty
 Sead Hadžibulić
 Sead Muratović
 Seah Eu Chin
 Seah Kian Peng
 Seah Moon Ming
 Seak Poh Leong
 Sealed with a Kiss (2015 TV series)
 Seamen's Articles of Agreement Convention, 1926
 Sean Lam
 Sean Roberts (soccer)
 Sebastian Sim
 Sebastian Teo
 Secom
 Second Geneva Convention
 Second Goh Chok Tong Cabinet
 Second Lee Hsien Loong Cabinet
 Second Lee Kuan Yew Cabinet
 Second lieutenant
 Second sergeant
 Second warrant officer
 Secondary education in Singapore
 Secret Garden (Singaporean TV series)
 Secret societies in Singapore
 Secret societies in colonial Singapore
 Secretlab
 Secrets for Sale
 Section 377A (Singapore)
 Securitas AB
 Security and Intelligence Division
 Security on the Mass Rapid Transit (Singapore)
 Secutor insidiator
 Sedition Act (Singapore)
 See Ewe Lay
 See Hiang To
 See Hoot Kee
 See Kee Oon
 Seet Ai Mee
 Segar LRT station
 Seiji Kaneko
 Selangor–Singapore rivalry
 Selarang Barracks incident
 Select Committee on Deliberate Online Falsehoods
 Selective En bloc Redevelopment Scheme
 Selegie Arts Centre
 Selegie House
 Selena Tan
 Seletar
 Seletar Aerospace Park
 Seletar Airport
 Seletar Bus Depot
 Seletar Camp
 Seletar Constituency
 Seletar Expressway
 Seletar Mall
 Seletar Robbery
 Seletar Teleport
 Self-governance of Singapore
 Selim Kaabi
 Selladore Vijayakumar
 SembCorp Logistics
 Sembawang
 Sembawang Air Base
 Sembawang Bus Interchange
 Sembawang Constituency
 Sembawang Group Representation Constituency
 Sembawang Hot Spring Park
 Sembawang MRT station
 Sembawang Park
 Sembawang Public Library
 Sembawang Rangers FC
 Sembawang Secondary School
 Sembawang Shopping Centre
 Sembcorp
 Sembcorp Marine
 Semoga Bahagia
 Senegal at the 2010 Summer Youth Olympics
 Seng Han Thong
 Seng Heng Engineering
 Sengkang
 Sengkang Bus Interchange
 Sengkang Community Club
 Sengkang Community Hospital
 Sengkang Depot
 Sengkang General Hospital
 Sengkang Group Representation Constituency
 Sengkang LRT line
 Sengkang MRT/LRT station
 Sengkang Public Library
 Sengkang Riverside Park
 Sengkang Secondary School
 Sengkang Sports Centre
 Sengkang West Single Member Constituency
 Seniman Bujang Lapok
 Senior Cambridge
 Senior Minister of Singapore
 Senior assistant commissioner
 Senior lieutenant colonel
 Senior staff sergeant
 Senior warrant officer
 Senja LRT station
 Senoko
 Senoko Energy
 Senoko Power Station
 Sensaura
 Sentosa
 Sentosa Cove
 Sentosa Development Corporation
 Sentosa Express
 Sentosa Ferry Terminal
 Sentosa Luge
 Sentosa Monorail
 Sentosa Musical Fountain
 Sentosa Satellite Earth Station
 Seow Chuan Koh
 Seow Peck Leng
 Seow Poh Leng
 Sepak takraw at the 2015 Southeast Asian Games
 Separation of powers in Singapore
 Sepoy Lines Constituency
 Serangoon
 Serangoon Bus Interchange
 Serangoon Constituency
 Serangoon Garden
 Serangoon Garden Secondary School
 Serangoon Gardens Constituency
 Serangoon Harbour
 Serangoon Junior College
 Serangoon MRT station
 Serangoon North
 Serangoon North MRT station
 Serangoon Road
 Serangoon Secondary School
 Serangoon Stadium
 Seraph Sun
 Serbia at the 2010 Summer Youth Olympics
 Serene Koong
 Serene Lee
 Serge Souchon-Koguia
 Sergeant
 Sergeant Hassan
 Sesame Street Spaghetti Space Chase
 Seth Galloway
 Seventh Lee Kuan Yew Cabinet
 Sevki Sha'ban
 Sex trafficking in Singapore
 Sex.Violence.FamilyValues
 Sexpo 2005
 Seychelles at the 2010 Summer Youth Olympics
 Sezairi Sezali
 Sha'ari Tadin
 Shabir Sulthan
 Shadrake v Attorney-General
 Shafeeq Faruk
 Shafuan Sutohmoh
 Shah Hirul
 Shah Razen Said
 Shah Shahiran
 Shahdan Sulaiman
 Shahe fen
 Shahfiq Ghani
 Shahib Masnawi
 Shahri Rahim
 Shahril Alias
 Shahril Ishak
 Shahril Jantan
 Shahrin Saberin
 Shahrulnizam Mazlan
 Shahul Rayyan
 Shaiful Esah
 Shakir Hamzah
 Shameer Aziq
 Shamil Sharif
 Shamini Flint
 Shamsi Ali
 Shamsul Maidin
 Shamsurin Abdul Rahman
 Shan Ratnam
 Shanda
 Shane McDonald
 Shane Pow
 Shane Ryan (association footballer)
 ShanghART Gallery
 Shanghai Singapore International School
 Shangri-La Dialogue
 Shangri-La Hotel Singapore
 Shangri-La Hotels and Resorts
 Shanina Shaik
 Shanmugam Murugesu
 Shannon Stephen
 Shanti Pereira
 Shaqi Sulaiman
 Sharanjit Leyl
 Shariff Abdul Samat
 Sharon Au
 Sharon Tay
 Sharul Nizam
 Shaun Chen
 Shaw House and Centre
 Shaw Organisation
 Shaw Plaza
 Shaw Tower, Singapore
 Shawal Anuar
 Shawallah Rashid
 Shawn Huang Wei Zhong
 Shawn Lee (actor)
 Shawn Tng
 Shawn Tok
 She Says (album)
 Shehan Karunatilaka
 Sheikh Abdul Hadi (footballer)
 Sheikh Haikel
 Sheila Sim (Singaporean actress)
 Shell House, Singapore
 Shelldon
 Shen Weixiao
 Sheng Siong
 Shengyu Lim
 Shenton Thomas
 Shenton Way
 Shenton Way Bus Terminal
 Shenton Way MRT station
 Sherif El-Masri
 Sherman Kwek
 Shermeen Lim
 Shi Jiayi
 Shi Lim
 Shi Ming Yi
 Shi Xin Hui
 ShiLi & Adi
 Shia Islam in Singapore
 Shigeo Ōdachi
 Shigga Shay
 Shih Choon Fong
 Shimpei Sakurada
 Shin Lim
 Shin Min Daily News
 Shine (Singapore festival)
 Shine for Singapore
 Shingo Suzuki
 Shinta Mulia Sari
 Shirin Fozdar
 Shirkers
 Shirley Ng
 Shodai Nishikawa
 Shogakukan Asia
 Shohei Doi
 Shoki Ohara
 Shoma Kondo
 Shona Lee
 Shooting Stars (Singaporean TV series)
 Shooting at the 2009 Asian Youth Games
 Shooting at the 2010 Summer Youth Olympics
 Shooting at the 2010 Summer Youth Olympics – Boys' 10 metre air pistol
 Shooting at the 2010 Summer Youth Olympics – Boys' 10 metre air rifle
 Shooting at the 2010 Summer Youth Olympics – Girls' 10 metre air pistol
 Shooting at the 2010 Summer Youth Olympics – Girls' 10 metre air rifle
 Shooting at the 2015 ASEAN Para Games
 Shooting at the 2015 Southeast Asian Games
 Shooting of Mohamed Taufik Zahar
 ShopBack
 Shopee
 Shopping (Fann Wong album)
 Shorea gibbosa
 Shorea platycarpa
 Short and Sweet (festival)
 Shota Matsuoka
 Shota Ochiai
 Shotaro Ihata
 Shou Zi Chew
 Shrek 4-D
 Shrew-faced squirrel
 Shuangbaotai
 Shubigi Rao
 Shueh-li Ong
 Shuhei Hoshino
 Shuhei Hotta
 Shuhei Sasahara
 Shukor Zailan
 Shun Inaba
 Shunkun Tani
 Shunsuke Fukuda (footballer, born 1999)
 Shunsuke Nakatake
 Shunsuke Sunaga
 Shuqun Secondary School
 Shuto Inaba
 Shuya Yamashita
 Shuyi Kwok
 Si Ling Secondary School
 Siam-Burma Death Railway
 Sibynophis melanocephalus
 Siddiq Durimi
 Sidek Saniff
 Sidhant Singh
 Siemens C651
 Sierra Leone at the 2010 Summer Youth Olympics
 Siew Shaw Her
 Siglap
 Siglap FC
 Siglap MRT station
 Siglap Secondary School
 Siglap Single Member Constituency
 Signals (Singapore Army)
 Sijil Kemuliaan
 Sikhism in Singapore
 Silat Melayu
 SilkAir
 SilkAir Flight 185
 Silver Support Scheme Act 2015
 Silvio Luoni
 Sim Ah Cheoh
 Sim Ann
 Sim Chi Yin
 Sim Kee Boon
 Sim Kwong Ho shophouses
 Sim Lim Square
 Sim Teck Yi
 Sim Woh Kum
 Sim Wong Hoo
 Simba Telecom
 Simei
 Simei MRT station
 Simon Casady (journalist)
 Simon Chan (theologian)
 Simon Cheong
 Simon Chesterman
 Simon Chua Ling Fung
 Simon Clark (English footballer)
 Simon Tay
 Simon Tensing de Cruz
 Simona Halperin
 Simone Lazaroo
 Simone McKinnis
 Simpang
 Simryn Gill
 Sims Avenue
 Sin Boon Ann
 Sin Chew Daily
 Sin Chew Jit Poh (Singapore)
 Sin Huat Eating House
 Sin Kek Tong
 Sin Ming
 Sin Poh (Star News) Amalgamated
 Sinchi FC
 Sindhu Nair
 Sing Po
 Sing to the Dawn
 SingHealth
 SingTel Hawker Heroes Challenge
 Singa the Lion
 Singai Nesan
 Singapore
 Singapore 2006
 Singapore ATP Challenger
 Singapore Academy of Law
 Singapore Accountancy Commission
 Singapore Act 1966
 Singapore Air Defence Command
 Singapore Airlines
 Singapore Airlines Cargo
 Singapore Airlines Flight 006
 Singapore Airlines Flight 117
 Singapore Airlines Flight 286
 Singapore Airlines Flights 21 and 22
 Singapore Airlines International Cup
 Singapore Airlines fleet
 Singapore Airshow
 Singapore Alliance Party
 Singapore Amateur Radio Transmitting Society
 Singapore American School
 Singapore Armed Forces
 Singapore Armed Forces Band
 Singapore Armed Forces Best Unit Competition
 Singapore Armed Forces Good Service Medal
 Singapore Armed Forces Long Service and Good Conduct (10 Years) Medal
 Singapore Armed Forces Long Service and Good Conduct (20 Years) Medal
 Singapore Armed Forces Merit Scholarship (Women)
 Singapore Armed Forces National Service Medal
 Singapore Armed Forces Overseas Scholarship
 Singapore Armed Forces Overseas Service Medal
 Singapore Armed Forces Parachute Team
 Singapore Armed Forces Training Institute (disambiguation)
 Singapore Armed Forces order of precedence
 Singapore Armed Forces ranks
 Singapore Army
 Singapore Art Museum
 Singapore Art Show
 Singapore Artillery
 Singapore Arts Street
 Singapore Association of the Visually Handicapped
 Singapore Aviation Academy
 Singapore Badminton Association
 Singapore Badminton Hall
 Singapore Ballet
 Singapore Baptist Convention
 Singapore Bible College
 Singapore Biennale
 Singapore Biennial Games
 Singapore Billie Jean King Cup team
 Singapore Book Publishers Association
 Singapore Botanic Gardens
 Singapore Buddhist Lodge
 Singapore Business Federation
 Singapore Business Review
 Singapore Cable Car
 Singapore Cancer Society
 Singapore Canoe Federation
 Singapore Centre for Chinese Language
 Singapore Chess Championship
 Singapore Chess Federation
 Singapore Children's Society
 Singapore Chinese Chamber of Commerce and Industry
 Singapore Chinese Football Club
 Singapore Chinese Girls' School
 Singapore Chinese Orchestra
 Singapore Chinese characters
 Singapore City Gallery
 Singapore Civil Defence Force
 Singapore Civil Service
 Singapore Classic
 Singapore Combat Engineers
 Singapore Community Shield
 Singapore Conference Hall
 Singapore Cooperation Programme
 Singapore Cord Blood Bank
 Singapore Council of Women
 Singapore Council of Women's Organisations
 Singapore Cricket Association
 Singapore Cricket Club
 Singapore Cricket Club Ground
 Singapore Cricket Club International Rugby Sevens
 Singapore Cruise Centre
 Singapore Cup
 Singapore Customs
 Singapore Cycling Federation
 Singapore Dads for Life movement
 Singapore Dark Alternative Movement
 Singapore Davis Cup team
 Singapore Day
 Singapore Declaration
 Singapore Democratic Alliance
 Singapore Democratic Party
 Singapore Derby
 Singapore Discovery Centre
 Singapore Dreaming
 Singapore English
 Singapore Examinations and Assessment Board
 Singapore Exchange
 Singapore Expo
 Singapore FA
 Singapore FA Cup
 Singapore FC
 Singapore Federation of Trade Unions
 Singapore FinTech Festival
 Singapore Fireworks Celebrations
 Singapore Floorball Association
 Singapore Flyer
 Singapore Flying College
 Singapore Food Agency
 Singapore Food Festival
 Singapore Football League
 Singapore Free Press
 Singapore Gaelic Lions
 Singapore Gamma Knife Centre
 Singapore Garden Festival
 Singapore General Hospital
 Singapore Girl
 Singapore Gold Cup
 Singapore Government Enterprise Architecture
 Singapore Grand Prix
 Singapore Green Plan 2012
 Singapore Green Plan 2030
 Singapore Heart Foundation
 Singapore Herald
 Singapore History Gallery
 Singapore Hit Awards 2007
 Singapore Hokkien Huay Kuan
 Singapore Hotel and Tourism Education Centre
 Singapore Human Resources Institute
 Singapore Ice Hockey Association
 Singapore Idol
 Singapore Improvement Trust
 Singapore Indian Association
 Singapore Indian Development Association
 Singapore Indian Fine Arts Society
 Singapore Indian Orchestra and Choir
 Singapore Indoor Stadium
 Singapore Innovation League
 Singapore Institute of International Affairs
 Singapore Institute of Management
 Singapore Institute of Purchasing and Materials Management
 Singapore Institute of Technology
 Singapore International
 Singapore International Arbitration Centre
 Singapore International Commercial Court
 Singapore International Energy Week
 Singapore International Festival of Arts
 Singapore International Film Festival
 Singapore International Foundation
 Singapore International Mediation Centre
 Singapore International Photography Festival
 Singapore International School
 Singapore International School of Bangkok
 Singapore International School, Bandung
 Singapore International School, Indonesia
 Singapore International School, Mumbai
 Singapore International Water Week
 Singapore Internet Exchange
 Singapore Islamic Hub
 Singapore Island
 Singapore Justice Party
 Singapore Khalsa Association FC
 Singapore Kindness Movement
 Singapore Korean International School
 Singapore Labour Foundation
 Singapore Lacrosse Association
 Singapore Land Authority
 Singapore Land Tower
 Singapore League Cup
 Singapore Legal Service
 Singapore Life Church
 Singapore Literature Prize
 Singapore Malay Chamber of Commerce and Industry
 Singapore Management University
 Singapore Marathon
 Singapore Masters
 Singapore Masters (snooker)
 Singapore Mathematical Olympiad
 Singapore Media Academy
 Singapore Mediation Centre
 Singapore Mediation Convention
 Singapore Medical Association
 Singapore Mercantile Exchange
 Singapore Miniature Zoo
 Singapore Mint
 Singapore National Academy of Science
 Singapore National Cadet Corps Command Band
 Singapore National Co-operative Federation
 Singapore National Day Parade
 Singapore National Day Parade, 2017
 Singapore National Day Parade, 2018
 Singapore National Day Rally
 Singapore National Eye Centre
 Singapore National Front
 Singapore National Ice Hockey League
 Singapore National Olympic Council
 Singapore National Para Games
 Singapore National Youth Orchestra
 Singapore Naval Base
 Singapore Network Information Centre
 Singapore Open (badminton)
 Singapore Open (golf)
 Singapore Open (men's tennis)
 Singapore Open Exchange
 Singapore Order of Precedence
 Singapore People's Alliance
 Singapore People's Party
 Singapore Petroleum Company
 Singapore Philatelic Museum
 Singapore Pinacothèque de Paris
 Singapore Po Leung Kuk
 Singapore Poetry Writing Month
 Singapore Police Force
 Singapore Police Force Band
 Singapore Police Force Crisis Negotiation Unit
 Singapore Police Service Good Service Medal
 Singapore Police Service Long Service and Good Conduct Medal
 Singapore Polo Club
 Singapore Polytechnic
 Singapore Pools
 Singapore Portrait Series currency notes
 Singapore Post
 Singapore Premier League
 Singapore Premier League Awards Night
 Singapore Press Holdings
 Singapore Prison Service
 Singapore Prisons Emergency Action Response
 Singapore Pro Wrestling
 Singapore Promising Brand Award
 Singapore Psychological Society
 Singapore Radio Awards 2010
 Singapore Raffles Music College
 Singapore Real Estate Exchange
 Singapore Recreation Club
 Singapore Red Cross Society
 Singapore Red Cross Youth
 Singapore Repertory Theatre
 Singapore River
 Singapore River Festival
 Singapore Rugby Union
 Singapore Sailing Federation
 Singapore Savings Bonds
 Singapore School Kelapa Gading
 Singapore School Manila
 Singapore School for the Deaf
 Singapore Science Park
 Singapore Scout Association
 Singapore Selection XI
 Singapore Sepaktakraw Federation
 Singapore Sevens
 Singapore Short Film Awards
 Singapore Sign Language
 Singapore Slammers
 Singapore Slingers
 Singapore Society for the Prevention of Cruelty to Animals
 Singapore Space and Technology Ltd
 Singapore Sports Hub
 Singapore Sports Museum
 Singapore Sports School
 Singapore Squash Rackets Association
 Singapore Standard (regulatory policy)
 Singapore Standard Time
 Singapore Stone
 Singapore Strait
 Singapore Strait crossing
 Singapore Sun Festival
 Singapore Swap Offer Rate
 Singapore Swimming Association
 Singapore Symphony Chorus
 Singapore Symphony Orchestra
 Singapore Taekwondo Federation
 Singapore Tamils
 Singapore Teachers' Union
 Singapore Teleview
 Singapore Tiger Standard
 Singapore Tonight
 Singapore Tourism Board
 Singapore Traction Company
 Singapore Trade Office in Taipei
 Singapore Treaty on the Law of Trademarks
 Singapore Turf Club
 Singapore Unbound
 Singapore Underground Road System
 Singapore United Party
 Singapore University of Social Sciences
 Singapore University of Technology and Design
 Singapore Volunteer Corps
 Singapore Weiqi Association
 Singapore Wing, Malayan Auxiliary Air Force
 Singapore Women's Hall of Fame
 Singapore Women's Masters
 Singapore Women's Tennis Exhibition
 Singapore Workplace Safety and Health Conference
 Singapore Writers Festival
 Singapore Youth Festival
 Singapore Youth Flying Club
 Singapore Youth Olympic Games Organising Committee
 Singapore Zoo
 Singapore and the United Nations
 Singapore and the World Bank
 Singapore at the 1948 Summer Olympics
 Singapore at the 1951 Asian Games
 Singapore at the 1952 Summer Olympics
 Singapore at the 1954 Asian Games
 Singapore at the 1956 Summer Olympics
 Singapore at the 1958 Asian Games
 Singapore at the 1958 British Empire and Commonwealth Games
 Singapore at the 1960 Summer Olympics
 Singapore at the 1962 British Empire and Commonwealth Games
 Singapore at the 1966 British Empire and Commonwealth Games
 Singapore at the 1968 Summer Olympics
 Singapore at the 1972 Summer Olympics
 Singapore at the 1974 Asian Games
 Singapore at the 1976 Summer Olympics
 Singapore at the 1982 Asian Games
 Singapore at the 1984 Summer Olympics
 Singapore at the 1988 Summer Olympics
 Singapore at the 1988 Summer Paralympics
 Singapore at the 1992 Summer Olympics
 Singapore at the 1992 Summer Paralympics
 Singapore at the 1996 Summer Olympics
 Singapore at the 1996 Summer Paralympics
 Singapore at the 1998 Asian Games
 Singapore at the 2000 Summer Olympics
 Singapore at the 2000 Summer Paralympics
 Singapore at the 2002 Asian Games
 Singapore at the 2004 Summer Olympics
 Singapore at the 2004 Summer Paralympics
 Singapore at the 2005 Southeast Asian Games
 Singapore at the 2006 Asian Games
 Singapore at the 2006 Commonwealth Games
 Singapore at the 2007 Southeast Asian Games
 Singapore at the 2008 Asian Beach Games
 Singapore at the 2008 Summer Olympics
 Singapore at the 2008 Summer Paralympics
 Singapore at the 2009 Asian Indoor Games
 Singapore at the 2009 Southeast Asian Games
 Singapore at the 2009 World Championships in Athletics
 Singapore at the 2010 Asian Games
 Singapore at the 2010 Asian Para Games
 Singapore at the 2010 Commonwealth Games
 Singapore at the 2010 Summer Youth Olympics
 Singapore at the 2011 Asian Winter Games
 Singapore at the 2011 Commonwealth Youth Games
 Singapore at the 2011 Southeast Asian Games
 Singapore at the 2011 World Aquatics Championships
 Singapore at the 2011 World Championships in Athletics
 Singapore at the 2012 Summer Olympics
 Singapore at the 2012 Summer Paralympics
 Singapore at the 2013 Southeast Asian Games
 Singapore at the 2013 World Aquatics Championships
 Singapore at the 2013 World Championships in Athletics
 Singapore at the 2014 Asian Beach Games
 Singapore at the 2014 Asian Games
 Singapore at the 2014 Commonwealth Games
 Singapore at the 2014 Summer Youth Olympics
 Singapore at the 2015 Southeast Asian Games
 Singapore at the 2015 World Aquatics Championships
 Singapore at the 2015 World Championships in Athletics
 Singapore at the 2016 Summer Olympics
 Singapore at the 2016 Summer Paralympics
 Singapore at the 2017 Asian Indoor and Martial Arts Games
 Singapore at the 2017 Asian Winter Games
 Singapore at the 2017 Southeast Asian Games
 Singapore at the 2017 Summer Deaflympics
 Singapore at the 2017 World Aquatics Championships
 Singapore at the 2018 Asian Games
 Singapore at the 2018 Asian Para Games
 Singapore at the 2018 Commonwealth Games
 Singapore at the 2018 Summer Youth Olympics
 Singapore at the 2018 Winter Olympics
 Singapore at the 2019 Southeast Asian Games
 Singapore at the 2019 Summer Universiade
 Singapore at the 2019 World Aquatics Championships
 Singapore at the 2019 World Athletics Championships
 Singapore at the 2020 Summer Olympics
 Singapore at the 2020 Summer Paralympics
 Singapore at the 2020 Winter Youth Olympics
 Singapore at the 2021 Asian Youth Para Games
 Singapore at the 2021 Southeast Asian Games
 Singapore at the 2022 Commonwealth Games
 Singapore at the 2022 World Aquatics Championships
 Singapore at the 2022 World Athletics Championships
 Singapore at the AFC Asian Cup
 Singapore at the Asian Games
 Singapore at the Commonwealth Games
 Singapore at the Olympics
 Singapore at the Paralympics
 Singapore at the Southeast Asian Games
 Singapore at the Summer Olympics
 Singapore bid for the 2010 Summer Youth Olympics
 Singapore blue
 Singapore cable car crash
 Singapore dollar
 Singapore embassies attack plot
 Singapore football league system
 Singapore hip hop
 Singapore ice hockey league
 Singapore in Malaysia
 Singapore in the ABU Radio Song Festival
 Singapore in the ABU TV Song Festival
 Singapore in the Straits Settlements
 Singapore issues
 Singapore math
 Singapore media mergers of 2004 and 2017
 Singapore men's national basketball team
 Singapore men's national field hockey team
 Singapore men's national floorball team
 Singapore men's national handball team
 Singapore men's national ice hockey team
 Singapore men's national softball team
 Singapore men's national under-16 basketball team
 Singapore men's national under-18 basketball team
 Singapore men's national volleyball team
 Singapore men's national water polo team
 Singapore mosque attacks plot
 Singapore national badminton team
 Singapore national baseball team
 Singapore national cerebral palsy football team
 Singapore national cricket team
 Singapore national football team
 Singapore national football team results
 Singapore national football team results (1948–1969)
 Singapore national football team results (1970–1989)
 Singapore national football team results (1990–1999)
 Singapore national football team results (2000–2019)
 Singapore national football team results (2020–present)
 Singapore national futsal team
 Singapore national netball team
 Singapore national rugby sevens team
 Singapore national rugby union team
 Singapore national under-16 football team
 Singapore national under-19 football team
 Singapore national under-21 football team
 Singapore national under-23 football team
 Singapore pavilion at Expo 2010
 Singapore sling
 Singapore strategy
 Singapore support for Iraq during the Iran–Iraq war
 Singapore whiskered bat
 Singapore women's national basketball team
 Singapore women's national beach handball team
 Singapore women's national cricket team
 Singapore women's national field hockey team
 Singapore women's national floorball team
 Singapore women's national football team
 Singapore women's national handball team
 Singapore women's national ice hockey team
 Singapore women's national rugby sevens team
 Singapore women's national rugby union team
 Singapore women's national under-16 basketball team
 Singapore women's national under-18 basketball team
 Singapore women's national under-18 softball team
 Singapore women's national under-18 volleyball team
 Singapore women's national volleyball team
 Singapore women's national water polo team
 Singapore's iPhone film festival
 Singapore-Cambridge GCE Advanced Level
 Singapore-Cambridge GCE Normal Level
 Singapore-Cambridge GCE Ordinary Level
 Singapore: The Encyclopedia
 Singaporean Americans
 Singaporean Australians
 Singaporean Canadians
 Singaporean Hokkien
 Singaporean Mandarin
 Singaporean National Badminton Championships
 Singaporean bridge
 Singaporean communitarianism
 Singaporean cuisine
 Singaporean literature
 Singaporean measures against Middle East respiratory syndrome
 Singaporean measures against avian influenza
 Singaporean nationality law
 Singaporean orders and decorations
 Singaporean passport
 Singaporean response to 2005 Kashmir earthquake
 Singaporean response to Hurricane Katrina
 Singaporean units of measurement
 Singaporeans
 Singaporeans First
 Singaporeans for Democracy
 Singaporeans in India
 Singaporeans in Malaysia
 Singaporeans in the United Kingdom
 Singapore–European Union relations
 Singapore–South Africa relations
 Singapore–South Korea relations
 Singapore–Spain relations
 Singapore–Taiwan relations
 Singapore–Thailand relations
 Singapore–Trinidad and Tobago relations
 Singapore–Turkey relations
 Singapore–United Kingdom relations
 Singapore–United States Free Trade Agreement
 Singapore–United States relations
 Singapore–Vietnam relations
 Singapura cat
 Singatrichona
 Singatrichona longipes
 Singdarin
 Singfest
 Single Convention on Narcotic Drugs
 Singlife with Aviva
 Singlish
 Singlish vocabulary
 Singtel
 Singtel TV
 Sinking of Prince of Wales and Repulse
 Sinnadurai Vellupillai
 Sino Hotels
 Sino-Portuguese architecture
 Sino-Singapore Tianjin Eco-city
 Sintercom
 Sinthusa nasaka
 Siong Leng Musical Association
 Siong Lim Temple
 Siow Lee Chin
 Sirajuddin of Perlis
 Sirina Camara
 Sisters' Islands
 Sisters' Islands Marine Park
 Sit Kim Ping
 Sitoh Yih Pin
 Situ Qiao
 Siu-Ying Ma
 Siva Chandran
 Sivakant Tiwari
 Six Battery Road
 Six Widows Case
 Sixology
 Sixten Boström
 Sixth Avenue MRT station
 Sixth Lee Kuan Yew Cabinet
 Siân Griffiths
 Sjahrir (Indonesian economist)
 Skarf
 Skip Wolters
 Skull and Bones (video game)
 Sky Habitat
 Skysuites @ Anson
 Slappy Cakes
 Slate Esports
 Slender squirrel
 Sliced fish soup
 Slim 10
 Slovakia at the 2010 Summer Youth Olympics
 Slovenia at the 2010 Summer Youth Olympics
 Small Five Group
 Small-toothed palm civet
 Smart Nation
 Smiling Kelly
 Smith Street, Singapore
 Smoking in Singapore
 Smooth-coated otter
 Sng Boh Khim
 Sng Ju Wei
 Snow City
 So Drama! Entertainment
 Sobs (band)
 Social Development Network
 Social Enterprise Association
 Socialist Front (Singapore, 2010)
 Socialwok
 Society of Intensive Care Medicine
 Society of Moral Charities
 Sofiane Mimouni
 Softball at the 2015 Southeast Asian Games
 Soh Rui Yong
 Solamalay Namasivayam
 Solomon Islands at the 2010 Summer Youth Olympics
 Solos (film)
 Somalia at the 2010 Summer Youth Olympics
 Somerset MRT station
 Son Yong-chan
 Sonar Radio
 Song Hoot Kiam
 Song In-young
 Song Kok Hoo
 Song Ong Siang
 Song Ui-young
 Song for Singapore
 Songs of the Sea
 Sonny Liew
 Soo Bee Lee
 Soo Hong Chew
 Soo K. Chan
 Soo Teck LRT station
 Sook Ching
 Soon Lee Bus Park
 Soon kueh
 Sophia Blackmore
 Sophia Cooke
 Sophia Pang
 Sora Ma
 Soto ayam
 Soto mie
 Soul Detective
 Soul'd
 Sound Blaster
 Sound Blaster 16
 Sound Blaster AWE32
 Sound Blaster AWE64
 Sound Blaster Audigy
 Sound Blaster Live!
 Sound Blaster Roar
 Sound Blaster X-Fi
 Sound Blaster X7
 Sound BlasterAxx
 Sounds Live Feels Live World Tour
 Soup of Life
 Sources of Singapore law
 Souta Sugiyama
 South Africa at the 2010 Summer Youth Olympics
 South Asian languages in Singapore
 South Beach Tower
 South Bridge Road
 South China Sea
 South East Asia Command
 South East Community Development Council
 South Korea at the 2010 Summer Youth Olympics
 South Seas Communist Party
 South Seas Society (Singapore)
 South View LRT station
 South West Community Development Council
 South by Java Head
 Southeast Asia Building (magazine)
 Southeast Asian Ceramic Society
 Southeast Asian Nuclear-Weapon-Free Zone Treaty
 Southern Integrated Gateway
 Southern Islands
 Southern Islands Constituency
 Southern Min
 Southern Ridges
 Space Liability Convention
 Spain at the 2010 Summer Youth Olympics
 Spalgis epius
 Spandeck Engineering v Defence Science and Technology Agency
 Spark (architects)
 Sparky Animation
 Speak Good English Movement
 Speak Mandarin Campaign
 Speaker of the Parliament of Singapore
 Speakers' Corner, Singapore
 Special Assistance Plan
 Special Operations Command (Singapore)
 Special Operations Force (Singapore)
 Special Operations Task Force
 Special Tactics and Rescue (Singapore)
 Special Warfare Group (Singapore)
 Special constable
 Specialist (Singapore)
 Specialist Cadet School
 Specialist and Warrant Officer Institute
 Specialist judge
 Specialists' Shopping Centre
 Speed limits in Singapore
 Spell Cast
 Spice Global
 Spice Siblings
 Spice Up (TV series)
 Spiking (fintech)
 Sport Singapore
 Sport in Singapore
 Sporting Afrique FC
 Sports in colonial times in Singapore
 SportsHero
 Spotlight Singapore
 Spouse for House
 Spouse of the president of Singapore
 Spring Street, Singapore
 Springfield Secondary School
 Springleaf MRT station
 Springleaf Tower
 Springs of Life
 Spuul
 Spyros disaster
 Squash at the 2015 Southeast Asian Games
 Squash at the 2015 Southeast Asian Games – Men's team
 Squash at the 2015 Southeast Asian Games – Women's team
 Squawk Australia
 Sree Ramar Temple
 Sri Darma Muneeswaran Temple
 Sri Krishnan Temple
 Sri Lanka at the 2010 Summer Youth Olympics
 Sri Lankans in Singapore
 Sri Lankaramaya Buddhist Temple
 Sri Maharaja
 Sri Manmatha Karuneshvarar Temple
 Sri Mariamman Temple, Singapore
 Sri Ramakrishna Darshanam
 Sri Rana Wikrama
 Sri Ruthra Kaliamman Temple
 Sri Senpaga Vinayagar Temple
 Sri Siva Durga Temple
 Sri Siva Krishna Temple
 Sri Sivan Temple
 Sri Srinivasa Perumal Temple
 Sri Temasek
 Sri Thendayuthapani Temple
 Sri Vadapathira Kaliamman Temple
 Sri Veeramakaliamman Temple
 Sri Wikrama Wira
 St Andrew's Cathedral, Singapore
 St James Power Station
 St Jerome's Laneway Festival
 St John Singapore
 St Luke's Hospital, Singapore
 St. Andrew's Community Hospital
 St. Gabriel's Secondary School
 St. Hilda's Secondary School
 St. Joseph's Institution, Singapore
 St. Margaret's Secondary School
 St. Matthew's Church, Singapore
 Stacey Muruthi
 Stadium MRT station
 Staff sergeant
 Stage 28
 Stamford American International School
 Stamford Constituency
 Stamford House, Singapore
 Stamford Raffles
 Stamford Road
 Stamp duty
 Stan Fougeroud
 Stand by Me (TV series)
 Standard Chartered Singapore
 Standard Chinese
 Standard Singaporean Mandarin
 Standing Sushi Bar
 Stanely Ng
 Stanislav Vidaković
 Stanley Street, Singapore
 Stanley Tan
 Stanley Wilson Jones
 Star Awards
 Star Awards 1998
 Star Awards 20
 Star Awards 2000
 Star Awards 2001
 Star Awards 2002
 Star Awards 2003
 Star Awards 2004
 Star Awards 2005
 Star Awards 2006
 Star Awards 2007
 Star Awards 2009
 Star Awards 2010
 Star Awards 2011
 Star Awards 2012
 Star Awards 2013
 Star Awards 2015
 Star Awards 2016
 Star Awards 2017
 Star Awards 2018
 Star Awards 2019
 Star Awards 2021
 Star Awards 2022
 Star Awards for All-Time Favourite Artiste
 Star Awards for Best Actor
 Star Awards for Best Actress
 Star Awards for Best Comedy Performer
 Star Awards for Best Current Affairs Presenter
 Star Awards for Best Director
 Star Awards for Best Drama Serial
 Star Awards for Best Evergreen Artiste
 Star Awards for Best Info-Ed Programme
 Star Awards for Best Info-Ed Programme Host
 Star Awards for Best Newcomer
 Star Awards for Best News Presenter
 Star Awards for Best News Story
 Star Awards for Best News/Current Affairs Presenter
 Star Awards for Best Programme Host
 Star Awards for Best Supporting Actor
 Star Awards for Best Supporting Actress
 Star Awards for Best Theme Song
 Star Awards for Best Variety Producer
 Star Awards for Best Variety Programme
 Star Awards for Best Variety Research Writer
 Star Awards for Best Variety Show Host
 Star Awards for Best Variety Special
 Star Awards for Favourite Female Character
 Star Awards for Favourite Host
 Star Awards for Favourite Male Character
 Star Awards for Favourite Onscreen Couple (Drama)
 Star Awards for Favourite Onscreen Partners (Variety)
 Star Awards for Honorary TV Award
 Star Awards for Most Popular Regional Artiste
 Star Awards for Rocket
 Star Awards for Social Media Award
 Star Awards for Special Achievement Award
 Star Awards for Toggle awards
 Star Awards for Top 10 Most Popular Female Artistes
 Star Awards for Top 10 Most Popular Male Artistes
 Star Awards for Top Rated Drama Serial
 Star Awards for Unforgettable Villain
 Star Awards for YES 933 Best Speech
 Star Chinese Movies
 Star Cruises
 Star Idol
 Star Search (Singaporean TV series)
 Star Search (Singaporean season 10)
 Star Search (Singaporean season 8)
 Star Search (Singaporean season 9)
 Star Wars: The Clone Wars – Jedi Alliance
 StarHub
 StarHub TV
 StarHub TVB Awards
 Start (Stefanie Sun album)
 State Courts of Singapore
 Station Diary
 Station inspector
 Statistics of the COVID-19 pandemic in Singapore
 Statute of the International Atomic Energy Agency
 Statute of the International Renewable Energy Agency
 Statutes of the International Committee of Military Medicine
 Statutes of the World Tourism Organization
 Statutory boards of the Singapore Government
 Stefan Milojević (footballer, born February 1989)
 Stefanie (album)
 Stefanie Sun
 Stefanie Tan
 Stefen Chow
 Stella (singer)
 Stella Kon
 Stella Seah
 Stephanie Marrian
 Stephen Ng Heng Seng
 Stephen Pimbley
 Stepping Out (Singaporean TV series)
 Steve Chia
 Steve Darby
 Steve Kean
 Steve Lu
 Steve Wicks
 Steven Chong
 Steven J. Green
 Steven Khoo
 Steven Tan
 Stevens MRT station
 Stewart Petrie
 Stipe Plazibat
 Stock Exchange of Singapore
 Stockholm Convention on Persistent Organic Pollutants
 Stories Untold (album)
 StoryChopsticks
 Strait of Malacca
 Straits Settlement and Johore Territorial Waters Agreement of 1927
 Straits Settlements Volunteer Force
 Straits Times Index
 Straits Trading Company
 Straits View
 Straits dollar
 Straits of Johor
 Streats
 Street Angels (1999 film)
 Street Fighter X Mega Man
 Streetdirectory.com
 Striped keelback
 Striped kukri snake
 Strontium Technology
 Structure and Interpretation of Computer Programs, JavaScript Edition
 Stuart Young (footballer)
 Study mama
 Style: (magazine)
 Stéphane Auvray
 Su Boyang
 Su Guaning
 Suastus gremius
 Subhas Anandan
 Subhas Chandra Bose
 Subra Suresh
 Subway (restaurant)
 Suchen Christine Lim
 Sudan at the 2010 Summer Youth Olympics
 Sudden (TV series)
 Sudiat Dali
 Suffian Hakim
 Sufian Anuar
 Sufianto Salleh
 Sugee cake
 Suguru Hashimoto
 Suhaimi Yusof
 Suhairi Sabri
 Suicide in Singapore
 Sukki Singapora
 Sultan Abu Bakar Complex
 Sultan Iskandar Building
 Sultan Mosque
 Sultan Shoal Lighthouse
 Sultan of Selangor's Cup
 Sumang LRT station
 Sumatra squall
 Sun Beibei
 Sun City Live Theatre
 Sun Plaza, Singapore
 Sun Sumei (engineer)
 Sun Tzu: War on Business
 Sun Wenlong
 Sun Xueling
 Sun Yat Sen Nanyang Memorial Hall
 Sun Yeneng
 Sunda Plate
 Sunda flying lemur
 Sunda pangolin
 Sunda slow loris
 Sundaresh Menon
 Sundarti Supriyanto
 Sundown Marathon
 Sungei Bedok MRT station
 Sungei Buloh Wetland Reserve
 Sungei Jurong
 Sungei Kadut
 Sungei Kadut MRT station
 Sungei Punggol
 Sungei Road
 Sungei Serangoon
 Sungei Simpang Kiri
 Sungei Tampines
 Sunny Ang
 Sunny Low
 Sunny Suwanmethanont
 Sunshine Empire
 Suntec City
 Suntec Singapore Convention and Exhibition Centre
 Sunwolves
 Super Nintendo World
 Super Reds FC
 Super Senior
 SuperBand
 Supermodel Me
 Supermodel Me (season 1)
 Supermodel Me (season 3)
 Supermodel Me (season 4)
 Supermodel Me (season 5)
 Supermodel Me (season 6)
 Supplementary Convention on the Abolition of Slavery
 Supply (Singapore Army)
 Supply Act (Singapore)
 Supreme Components International
 Supreme Court of Singapore
 Surachai Jaturapattarapong
 Surachai Jirasirichote
 Suranga Nanayakkara
 Surbana Jurong
 Suree Sukha
 Surendra vivarna
 Surendran Chandramohan
 Suresh Appusamy
 Suria (TV channel)
 Suria Prakash
 Suriname at the 2010 Summer Youth Olympics
 Suryopratomo
 Susan Hendrik van Sitteren
 Susan Lim
 Susan Long (journalist)
 Susie Lingham
 Susilo Bambang Yudhoyono
 Sutanto Tan
 Sutee Suksomkit
 Suzann Victor
 Suzanne Jung
 Suzhou Industrial Park
 Suzhou Singapore International School
 Swan & Maclaren Architects
 Swan Lake (Singapore)
 Swan and Lermit
 Swandi Kitto
 Swaziland at the 2010 Summer Youth Olympics
 Sweden at the 2010 Summer Youth Olympics
 Swee-Huat Lee
 Swensen's
 Swift-class patrol craft
 Swimming at the 2009 Asian Youth Games
 Swimming at the 2010 Summer Youth Olympics
 Swimming at the 2010 Summer Youth Olympics – Boys' 100 metre backstroke
 Swimming at the 2010 Summer Youth Olympics – Boys' 100 metre breaststroke
 Swimming at the 2010 Summer Youth Olympics – Boys' 100 metre butterfly
 Swimming at the 2010 Summer Youth Olympics – Boys' 100 metre freestyle
 Swimming at the 2010 Summer Youth Olympics – Boys' 200 metre backstroke
 Swimming at the 2010 Summer Youth Olympics – Boys' 200 metre breaststroke
 Swimming at the 2010 Summer Youth Olympics – Boys' 200 metre butterfly
 Swimming at the 2010 Summer Youth Olympics – Boys' 200 metre freestyle
 Swimming at the 2010 Summer Youth Olympics – Boys' 200 metre individual medley
 Swimming at the 2010 Summer Youth Olympics – Boys' 4 × 100 metre freestyle relay
 Swimming at the 2010 Summer Youth Olympics – Boys' 4 × 100 metre medley relay
 Swimming at the 2010 Summer Youth Olympics – Boys' 400 metre freestyle
 Swimming at the 2010 Summer Youth Olympics – Boys' 50 metre backstroke
 Swimming at the 2010 Summer Youth Olympics – Boys' 50 metre breaststroke
 Swimming at the 2010 Summer Youth Olympics – Boys' 50 metre butterfly
 Swimming at the 2010 Summer Youth Olympics – Boys' 50 metre freestyle
 Swimming at the 2010 Summer Youth Olympics – Girls' 100 metre backstroke
 Swimming at the 2010 Summer Youth Olympics – Girls' 100 metre breaststroke
 Swimming at the 2010 Summer Youth Olympics – Girls' 100 metre butterfly
 Swimming at the 2010 Summer Youth Olympics – Girls' 100 metre freestyle
 Swimming at the 2010 Summer Youth Olympics – Girls' 200 metre backstroke
 Swimming at the 2010 Summer Youth Olympics – Girls' 200 metre breaststroke
 Swimming at the 2010 Summer Youth Olympics – Girls' 200 metre butterfly
 Swimming at the 2010 Summer Youth Olympics – Girls' 200 metre freestyle
 Swimming at the 2010 Summer Youth Olympics – Girls' 200 metre individual medley
 Swimming at the 2010 Summer Youth Olympics – Girls' 4 × 100 metre freestyle relay
 Swimming at the 2010 Summer Youth Olympics – Girls' 4 × 100 metre medley relay
 Swimming at the 2010 Summer Youth Olympics – Girls' 400 metre freestyle
 Swimming at the 2010 Summer Youth Olympics – Girls' 50 metre backstroke
 Swimming at the 2010 Summer Youth Olympics – Girls' 50 metre breaststroke
 Swimming at the 2010 Summer Youth Olympics – Girls' 50 metre butterfly
 Swimming at the 2010 Summer Youth Olympics – Girls' 50 metre freestyle
 Swimming at the 2010 Summer Youth Olympics – Mixed 4 × 100 metre freestyle relay
 Swimming at the 2010 Summer Youth Olympics – Mixed 4 × 100 metre medley relay
 Swimming at the 2015 ASEAN Para Games
 Swimming at the 2015 Southeast Asian Games
 Swimming at the 2015 Southeast Asian Games – Men's 100 metre backstroke
 Swimming at the 2015 Southeast Asian Games – Men's 100 metre breaststroke
 Swimming at the 2015 Southeast Asian Games – Men's 100 metre butterfly
 Swimming at the 2015 Southeast Asian Games – Men's 100 metre freestyle
 Swimming at the 2015 Southeast Asian Games – Men's 1500 metre freestyle
 Swimming at the 2015 Southeast Asian Games – Men's 200 metre backstroke
 Swimming at the 2015 Southeast Asian Games – Men's 200 metre breaststroke
 Swimming at the 2015 Southeast Asian Games – Men's 200 metre butterfly
 Swimming at the 2015 Southeast Asian Games – Men's 200 metre freestyle
 Swimming at the 2015 Southeast Asian Games – Men's 200 metre individual medley
 Swimming at the 2015 Southeast Asian Games – Men's 4 × 100 metre freestyle relay
 Swimming at the 2015 Southeast Asian Games – Men's 4 × 100 metre medley relay
 Swimming at the 2015 Southeast Asian Games – Men's 4 × 200 metre freestyle relay
 Swimming at the 2015 Southeast Asian Games – Men's 400 metre freestyle
 Swimming at the 2015 Southeast Asian Games – Men's 400 metre individual medley
 Swimming at the 2015 Southeast Asian Games – Men's 50 metre backstroke
 Swimming at the 2015 Southeast Asian Games – Men's 50 metre breaststroke
 Swimming at the 2015 Southeast Asian Games – Men's 50 metre butterfly
 Swimming at the 2015 Southeast Asian Games – Men's 50 metre freestyle
 Swimming at the 2015 Southeast Asian Games – Women's 100 metre backstroke
 Swimming at the 2015 Southeast Asian Games – Women's 100 metre breaststroke
 Swimming at the 2015 Southeast Asian Games – Women's 100 metre butterfly
 Swimming at the 2015 Southeast Asian Games – Women's 100 metre freestyle
 Swimming at the 2015 Southeast Asian Games – Women's 200 metre backstroke
 Swimming at the 2015 Southeast Asian Games – Women's 200 metre breaststroke
 Swimming at the 2015 Southeast Asian Games – Women's 200 metre butterfly
 Swimming at the 2015 Southeast Asian Games – Women's 200 metre freestyle
 Swimming at the 2015 Southeast Asian Games – Women's 200 metre individual medley
 Swimming at the 2015 Southeast Asian Games – Women's 4 × 100 metre freestyle relay
 Swimming at the 2015 Southeast Asian Games – Women's 4 × 100 metre medley relay
 Swimming at the 2015 Southeast Asian Games – Women's 4 × 200 metre freestyle relay
 Swimming at the 2015 Southeast Asian Games – Women's 400 metre freestyle
 Swimming at the 2015 Southeast Asian Games – Women's 400 metre individual medley
 Swimming at the 2015 Southeast Asian Games – Women's 50 metre backstroke
 Swimming at the 2015 Southeast Asian Games – Women's 50 metre breaststroke
 Swimming at the 2015 Southeast Asian Games – Women's 50 metre butterfly
 Swimming at the 2015 Southeast Asian Games – Women's 50 metre freestyle
 Swimming at the 2015 Southeast Asian Games – Women's 800 metre freestyle
 Swiss Chamber of Commerce and Industry in Singapore
 Swiss Cottage Secondary School
 Swiss School in Singapore
 Swissôtel The Stamford
 Switched! (Singaporean TV series)
 Switzerland at the 2010 Summer Youth Olympics
 Syabil Hisham
 Syafiq Zainal
 Syahiran Miswan
 Syahrul Sazali
 Syaiful Iskandar
 Syaqir Sulaiman
 Syazwan Buhari
 Syazwan Tajudin
 Sydney Brenner
 Syed Abdul Kadir
 Syed Abdul Rahman Alsagoff
 Syed Ahmad Alwee Alsree
 Syed Ahmad Shahabuddin
 Syed Fadhil
 Syed Faruk
 Syed Karim
 Syed Mohamed bin Ahmad Alsagoff
 Syed Mohamed bin Ahmed Alsagoff
 Syed Najmuddin Hashim
 Syed Thaha
 Syllepte microsema
 Sylvester Sim
 Sylvia Lim
 Sylvia Ratonel
 Sylvia Toh
 Symbrenthia lilaea
 Symphony 924
 Symphony Lake (Singapore)
 Synchronised swimming at the 2015 Southeast Asian Games
 Syonan Jinja
 Syria at the 2009 Asian Youth Games
 Syria at the 2010 Summer Youth Olympics
 Systems on Silicon Manufacturing
 São Tomé and Príncipe at the 2010 Summer Youth Olympics
 Sébastien Etiemble
 Sōichirō Tanaka (footballer)

T

 T'ang Quartet
 T. J. D. Campbell
 T. S. Sinnathuray
 T. Sasitharan
 T. T. Durai
 T. T. Rajah
 T.K. Sabapathy
 TCA College (Singapore)
 TCA Raghavan
 TIISCS
 TIS (cable system)
 TM Asia Life
 TPV Technology
 TR Emeritus
 TRIPS Agreement
 TSMP Law Corporation
 TUM Asia
 TVMobile
 TWG Tea
 Tabitha Nauser
 Tabla!
 Table of Glory
 Table tennis at the 1973 Southeast Asian Peninsular Games
 Table tennis at the 1983 Southeast Asian Games
 Table tennis at the 2009 Asian Youth Games
 Table tennis at the 2010 Summer Youth Olympics
 Table tennis at the 2010 Summer Youth Olympics – Men's singles
 Table tennis at the 2010 Summer Youth Olympics – Mixed team
 Table tennis at the 2010 Summer Youth Olympics – Women's singles
 Table tennis at the 2015 ASEAN Para Games
 Table tennis at the 2015 Southeast Asian Games
 Table tennis at the 2015 Southeast Asian Games – Men's doubles
 Table tennis at the 2015 Southeast Asian Games – Men's singles
 Table tennis at the 2015 Southeast Asian Games – Men's team
 Table tennis at the 2015 Southeast Asian Games – Mixed doubles
 Table tennis at the 2015 Southeast Asian Games – Women's doubles
 Table tennis at the 2015 Southeast Asian Games – Women's singles
 Table tennis at the 2015 Southeast Asian Games – Women's team
 Tachi Yamada
 Tadaaki Yazawa
 Tadanari Lee
 Taekwondo at the 2010 Summer Youth Olympics
 Taekwondo at the 2010 Summer Youth Olympics – Boys' +73 kg
 Taekwondo at the 2010 Summer Youth Olympics – Boys' 48 kg
 Taekwondo at the 2010 Summer Youth Olympics – Boys' 55 kg
 Taekwondo at the 2010 Summer Youth Olympics – Boys' 63 kg
 Taekwondo at the 2010 Summer Youth Olympics – Boys' 73 kg
 Taekwondo at the 2010 Summer Youth Olympics – Girls' +63 kg
 Taekwondo at the 2010 Summer Youth Olympics – Girls' 44 kg
 Taekwondo at the 2010 Summer Youth Olympics – Girls' 49 kg
 Taekwondo at the 2010 Summer Youth Olympics – Girls' 55 kg
 Taekwondo at the 2010 Summer Youth Olympics – Girls' 63 kg
 Taekwondo at the 2015 Southeast Asian Games
 Tagiades gana
 Tagiades japetus
 Tahu goreng
 Tai Pei Yuen
 Tai Seng Facility Building
 Tai Seng MRT station
 Tai-Heng Cheng
 Taipei Representative Office in Singapore
 Taisuke Akiyoshi
 Taiyo Nishida
 Tajeli Salamat
 Tajikistan at the 2010 Summer Youth Olympics
 Tajuria cippus
 Tajuria mantra
 Tak Giu
 Takahiro Koga
 Takahiro Saito
 Takahiro Tezuka
 Takashimaya
 Takasuke Goto
 Takatoshi Uchida
 Takaya Kawanabe
 Takaya Sugasawa
 Take 2 (film)
 Takeshi Ito
 Takeshi Miki
 Taku Morinaga
 Takuma Ito (footballer)
 Takuya Akiyama
 Takuya Hidaka
 Tales dos Santos
 Talking Cock the Movie
 TalkingCock.com
 Taman Jurong
 Tamil Murasu
 Tamil diaspora
 Tamil language
 Tamils
 Tamim bin Hamad Al Thani
 Tampines
 Tampines 1
 Tampines Bike Park
 Tampines Bus Interchange
 Tampines Central
 Tampines Concourse Bus Interchange
 Tampines Constituency
 Tampines East MRT station
 Tampines Eco Green
 Tampines Expressway
 Tampines Group Representation Constituency
 Tampines Junior College
 Tampines MRT station
 Tampines Mall
 Tampines Meridian Junior College
 Tampines North Bus Interchange
 Tampines North MRT station
 Tampines Regional Library
 Tampines Rovers FC
 Tampines Secondary School
 Tampines West MRT station
 Tan Aik Huang
 Tan Boo Liat
 Tan Boon Teik
 Tan Boon Wah
 Tan Chay Wa's tombstone trial
 Tan Cheng Bock
 Tan Cheng Han
 Tan Cheng Hiong
 Tan Chin Hwee
 Tan Chin Tuan
 Tan Chong Tee
 Tan Choo Leng
 Tan Chor Jin
 Tan Chorh Chuan
 Tan Chuan-Jin
 Tan Chye Cheng
 Tan Eng Bock
 Tan Eng Chye
 Tan Eng Hong v AG
 Tan Eng Yoon
 Tan Hiok Nee
 Tan Howe Liang
 Tan Jee Say
 Tan Jiak Kim
 Tan Kah Kee
 Tan Kah Kee MRT station
 Tan Kee Soon
 Tan Keong Choon
 Tan Keong Saik
 Tan Kheng Hua
 Tan Khoon Yong
 Tan Kiat How
 Tan Kim Ching
 Tan Kim Huat
 Tan Kim Seng
 Tan Kim Seng Fountain
 Tan Kin Lian
 Tan Lark Sye
 Tan Lee Meng
 Tan Lian Ann
 Tan Paey Fern
 Tan Pin Pin
 Tan Ping Koon
 Tan See Leng
 Tan Seng Poh
 Tan Ser Cher
 Tan Si Chong Su
 Tan Si Lie
 Tan Sio Beng
 Tan Soo Khoon
 Tan Suee Chieh
 Tan Swie Hian
 Tan Sze En
 Tan Tai Yong
 Tan Tarn How
 Tan Teck Guan Building
 Tan Teck Meng
 Tan Teck Neo
 Tan Teng Kee
 Tan Teow Yeow
 Tan Thuan Heng
 Tan Tiancheng
 Tan Tin Wee
 Tan Tock Seng
 Tan Tock Seng Hospital
 Tan Tong Hye
 Tan Wah Piow
 Tan Wearn Haw
 Tan Wee Beng
 Tan Wu Meng
 Tan Xiang Tian
 Tan Yinglan
 Tan Yock Lin
 Tanaecia pelea
 Tanah Merah Constituency
 Tanah Merah Ferry Terminal
 Tanah Merah Ferry Terminal murder
 Tanah Merah MRT station
 Tanah Merah, Singapore
 Tang Choon Keng
 Tang Da Wu
 Tang Dynasty City
 Tang Fong Har
 Tang Guan Seng
 Tang I-Fang
 Tang Liang Hong
 Tang Miao (footballer, born October 1990)
 Tang Pui Wah
 Tang Xin
 Tanglin
 Tanglin (TV series)
 Tanglin Circus Fountain
 Tanglin Club
 Tanglin Community Club
 Tanglin Halt
 Tanglin Police Division
 Tanglin Secondary School
 Tanglin Single Member Constituency
 Tanglin Trust School
 Tanglin railway station
 Tangs
 Tania De Rozario
 Tanis (musician)
 Tanja Manuela Sadow
 Tanjong Katong Complex
 Tanjong Katong Girls' School
 Tanjong Katong MRT station
 Tanjong Katong Primary School
 Tanjong Katong Secondary School
 Tanjong Pagar
 Tanjong Pagar Dock Company
 Tanjong Pagar Group Representation Constituency
 Tanjong Pagar MRT station
 Tanjong Pagar Park
 Tanjong Pagar Single Member Constituency
 Tanjong Pagar United FC
 Tanjong Pagar railway station
 Tanjong Rhu
 Tanjong Rhu MRT station
 Tanjung Kupang
 Tank Road railway station
 Tanker Pacific
 Tanya Chua
 Tanzania at the 2010 Summer Youth Olympics
 Tao Li
 Tao Nan School
 Taoism in Singapore
 Tapena
 Tapena thwaitesi
 Tara Teng
 Taractrocera archias
 Taractrocera ardonia
 Tarik Čmajčanin
 Tasha Low
 Task Force 73
 Taste of Love (Singaporean TV series)
 Tat Tong
 Tatsumi (film)
 Tatsunori Yamagata
 Tatsuro Inui
 Tatsuya Sambongi
 Tatsuya Sase
 Tatsuyuki Okuyama
 TauRx Therapeutics
 Taufik Batisah
 Taufik Suparno
 Taufiq Ghani
 Taufiq Muqminin
 Taufiq Rahmat
 Tavistock MRT station
 Tawas MRT station
 Taxation in Singapore
 Taxi! Taxi! (2013 film)
 Taxila haquinus
 Taxis of Singapore
 Tay Bee Aye
 Tay Cheng Khoon
 Tay Chin Joo
 Tay Eng Soon
 Tay Geok Teat
 Tay Kay Chin
 Tay Kewei
 Tay Kexin
 Tay Peng Hian
 Tay Peng Kee
 Tay Ping Hui
 Tay Seow Huah
 Tay Teow Kiat
 Tay Wei Ming
 Tay Yong Kwang
 TeLEOS-1
 Team Flash
 Teban Gardens
 Tech in Asia
 Technology Incubation Scheme
 Teck Ghee MRT station
 Teck Ghee Single Member Constituency
 Teck Lee LRT station
 Teck Lim Road
 Teck Whye LRT station
 Teck Whye Secondary School
 Teck-Hua Ho
 Teck-Seng Low
 Teddy Tang
 Tee Tua Ba
 Tee Yih Jia
 Teenage Mutant Ninja Turtles: Turtles in Time Re-Shelled
 Teerasak Po-on
 Teh Cheang Wan
 Teh tarik
 Tekka Centre
 Telecommunications in Singapore
 Telephone numbers in Singapore
 Television in Singapore
 Telicota augias
 Telin Singapore
 Telok Ayer Chinese Methodist Church
 Telok Ayer Constituency
 Telok Ayer MRT station
 Telok Ayer Street
 Telok Blangah
 Telok Blangah Hill Park
 Telok Blangah MRT station
 Telok Blangah Single Member Constituency
 Telok Kurau Secondary School
 Temasek
 Temasek Cares
 Temasek Foundation
 Temasek Holdings
 Temasek Junior College
 Temasek Life Sciences Laboratory
 Temasek Polytechnic
 Temasek Secondary School
 Temenggong Abdul Rahman
 Temenggong Daeng Ibrahim
 Temple Street, Singapore
 Ten Mile Junction Depot
 Ten Mile Junction LRT station
 Ten year series
 Tenashar
 Teng Bin
 Tengah
 Tengah Air Base
 Tengah Depot
 Tengah MRT station
 Tengah Park MRT station
 Tengah Plantation MRT station
 Tengah, Singapore
 Tengku Alam Shah
 Tengku Amir Shah
 Tengku Ampuan Tua Intan Zaharah
 Tengku Muhammad Shawal bin Tengku Abdul Aziz
 Tengku Mushadad
 Tennis at the 2010 Summer Youth Olympics
 Tennis at the 2010 Summer Youth Olympics – Boys' doubles
 Tennis at the 2010 Summer Youth Olympics – Boys' singles
 Tennis at the 2010 Summer Youth Olympics – Girls' doubles
 Tennis at the 2010 Summer Youth Olympics – Girls' singles
 Tennis at the 2015 Southeast Asian Games
 Tennis at the 2015 Southeast Asian Games – Men's doubles
 Tennis at the 2015 Southeast Asian Games – Men's singles
 Tennis at the 2015 Southeast Asian Games – Men's team
 Tennis at the 2015 Southeast Asian Games – Mixed doubles
 Tennis at the 2015 Southeast Asian Games – Women's doubles
 Tennis at the 2015 Southeast Asian Games – Women's singles
 Tennis at the 2015 Southeast Asian Games – Women's team
 Teo Bee Yen
 Teo Chee Hean
 Teo Cheng Kiat
 Teo Ho Pin
 Teo Hong Road
 Teo Poh Leng
 Teo Ser Luck
 Teo Shun Xie
 Teo Soh Lung v Minister for Home Affairs
 Teo Soon Kim
 Teo Wan Lin
 Teochew Poit Ip Huay Kuan
 Teochew dialect
 Teochew porridge
 Teoh Yi Peng
 Teong Tzen Wei
 Terence Cao
 Terence Koh (sailor)
 Teresa Hsu
 Terrex ICV
 Terroreign (Apocalyptic Armageddon Command)
 Terrorism in Singapore
 Terrorist Bombings Convention
 Terrorist Financing Convention
 Terry Butcher
 Terry Hee
 Terry Kee Buck Hwa
 Terry Pathmanathan
 Terry Toh
 Teun Koolhaas
 Thai Express
 ThaiBev
 Thailand at the 2010 Summer Youth Olympics
 Thailand at the 2015 Southeast Asian Games
 Thaipusam
 Thais in Singapore
 Thakral Corporation
 Thali
 Thalli Pogathey (TV series)
 Thamizhavel G. Sarangapani
 Thanggam LRT station
 Tharman Shanmugaratnam
 That Girl in Pinafore
 That One No Enough
 Thawatchai Damrong-Ongtrakul
 The 1989 World Tour
 The Amazing Race 13
 The Amazing Race 16
 The Amazing Race 2
 The Amazing Race 22
 The Amazing Race 23
 The Amazing Race 24
 The Amazing Race 25
 The Amazing Race 3
 The Amazing Race 4
 The Amazing Race 5
 The Amazing Race Asia 1
 The Amazing Race Asia 2
 The Amazing Race Asia 4
 The Amazing Race Asia 5
 The Amazing Race Australia 1
 The Amazing Race China 4
 The Amazing Race Vietnam 2013
 The Angel, the Devil and I
 The Antique Shop
 The Apprentice Asia
 The Apprentice: ONE Championship Edition
 The Arena (TV series)
 The Art of Charlie Chan Hock Chye
 The Artists Village
 The Arts House
 The Ascott Limited
 The Asian Banker
 The Awakening (TV series)
 The Bachelor (American season 23)
 The Bachelorette (Australian season 2)
 The Battle Box
 The Beautiful Scent
 The Beginning (TV series)
 The Best Bet
 The Best Things in Life
 The Big Day (2018 film)
 The Black Tides of Heaven
 The Blue Mansion
 The Bondmaid
 The Bridge (2018 TV series)
 The Business Times (Singapore)
 The Caregivers
 The Cathay
 The Cenotaph, Singapore
 The Centrepoint
 The Challenger Muay Thai
 The Champion (TV series)
 The Chinese High School (Singapore)
 The Chinese High School Clock Tower Building
 The Church of Jesus Christ of Latter-day Saints in Singapore
 The Cocoa Trees
 The Complete Works of Charles Darwin Online
 The Concourse
 The Contender Asia
 The Crime Hunters
 The Dark Web (docuseries)
 The Day It Rained on Our Parade
 The Defining Moment (TV series)
 The Destined One
 The Diam Diam Era
 The Diam Diam Era Two
 The Dream Catchers
 The Dream Job
 The Dream Makers (TV series)
 The Dream Makers II
 The Enchanted (TV series)
 The Eye (2002 film)
 The Faith of Anna Waters
 The Family Court (TV series)
 The Final 1 (season 1)
 The Final 1 (season 2)
 The Fishball Story
 The Float @ Marina Bay
 The Flying Fish
 The Forgotten Army - Azaadi Ke Liye
 The Fortune Handbook
 The Frangipani Tree Mystery
 The Fullerton Hotel Singapore
 The Fullerton Waterboat House
 The Gambia at the 2010 Summer Youth Olympics
 The Gateway (Singapore)
 The Gentlemen (TV series)
 The Ghosts Must Be Crazy
 The Glittering Days
 The Golden Path (TV series)
 The Golden Pillow
 The Greatest Love of All (TV series)
 The Guest People
 The Heaven Sword and Dragon Saber (2003 TV series)
 The Helping Hand (halfway house)
 The Hive, Singapore
 The Homecoming (TV series)
 The Hotel (Singaporean TV series)
 The Hour Glass (company)
 The Immolation
 The In-Laws (TV series)
 The Interlace
 The International 2022
 The International Academic Forum
 The Invincible Squad
 The Islamic Bank of Asia
 The Istana
 The Japanese School Singapore
 The Journey (TV series)
 The Journey: A Voyage
 The Journey: Our Homeland
 The Journey: Tumultuous Times
 The Kitchen Musical
 The Lead
 The Leap Years
 The Learning Lab
 The Legendary Swordsman
 The Legends of Jigong
 The Letter (play)
 The Lion Men
 The Lion Men: Ultimate Showdown
 The Little Nyonya
 The Live Radio
 The Long Pursuit
 The Lover's Inventory
 The Maid (2005 film)
 The Majestic, Singapore
 The Making of Malaysia
 The Man on the Other Side
 The Maritime Experiential Museum
 The Medium (1992 film)
 The Met (skyscraper)
 The Moment (Stefanie Sun album)
 The Naked DJ
 The Necessary Stage
 The New 7th Storey Hotel
 The New Adventures of Nanoboy
 The New Adventures of Wisely
 The New Paper
 The Noose (TV series)
 The Oath (Singaporean TV series)
 The Observatory (band)
 The Online Citizen
 The Orchard Residences
 The Pano
 The Peak (TV series)
 The Philharmonic Orchestra
 The Philharmonic Winds
 The Pinnacle@Duxton
 The Plaza (Singapore)
 The President's Pleasure (Singapore)
 The Price of Peace
 The Projector
 The Pupil (TV series)
 The Purple Parade
 The Quarters (TV series)
 The Queen (Singaporean TV series)
 The Quests
 The Red Threads of Fortune
 The Remix Master
 The Return of the Condor Heroes (Singaporean TV series)
 The Reunion (TV series)
 The Ritz-Carlton Millenia Singapore
 The Rundown (Singaporean TV program)
 The Sail @ Marina Bay
 The Sam Willows
 The Sam Willows discography
 The Scarlet Singapore
 The Scent of the Gods
 The Score (Singaporean TV series)
 The Seeds of Life
 The Serpent's Tooth
 The Shining Star
 The Shrimp People
 The Singapore Grip
 The Singapore Grip (TV series)
 The Snowfield
 The Song of Scorpions
 The Songs We Sang
 The Steve McQueens
 The Straits Times
 The Substation
 The Sword and the Song
 The TENG Company
 The Teenage Textbook
 The Teenage Textbook Movie
 The Teenage Workbook
 The Teochew Family
 The Thin Line (TV series)
 The Tree (2001 film)
 The Truth (2008 TV series)
 The Truth Seekers
 The Ultimatum
 The Unbeatables
 The Unbeatables I
 The Unbeatables II
 The Unbeatables III
 The Unbroken Cycle
 The Undisclosed
 The Vagrant (TV series)
 The Verge, Singapore
 The Virgin Soldiers
 The Voice (Singaporean and Malaysian TV series)
 The Wedding Game
 The Woman's Book of Superlatives
 TheFrenchCellar
 Thea Lim
 TheatreWorks (Singapore)
 Theerawekin Seehawong
 Thekchen Choling
 Theodore Fraser
 Theophilus Kwek
 Theopropus elegans
 Therapeutic Targets Database
 Therdsak Chaiman
 There's No Place I'd Rather Be
 Theresa Goh
 Theresa Poh Lin Chan
 They Call Her Cleopatra Wong
 They Do Return...But Gently Lead Them Back
 Thian Hock Keng
 Thio Gim Hock
 Thio Li-ann
 Thio Shen Yi
 Thio Su Mien
 Third East Asia Summit
 Third Geneva Convention
 Third Goh Chok Tong Cabinet
 Third Lee Hsien Loong Cabinet
 Third Lee Kuan Yew Cabinet
 Third Rail (TV series)
 Third sergeant
 Third warrant officer
 Third-Party Taxi Booking Service Providers Act
 Thirteenth East Asia Summit
 This Is What Inequality Looks Like
 Thomas (Jarvis novel)
 Thomas Beattie (footballer)
 Thomas Biketi
 Thomas Braddell
 Thomas Church (colonial administrator)
 Thomas Durcan
 Thomas Lim
 Thomas Ong
 Thomas Otho Travers
 Thomas Oxley (British surgeon)
 Thomas P. Campbell
 Thomas Thomas (trade unionist)
 Thomas Yeo
 Thomas Zilliacus
 Thomisus callidus
 Thomson Group Representation Constituency
 Thomson Medical Centre
 Thomson Nature Park
 Thomson Plaza
 Thomson Road Grand Prix circuit
 Thomson Road, Singapore
 Thomson Single Member Constituency
 Thomson, Singapore
 Thomson–East Coast MRT line
 Thong Saw Pak
 Thora Oehlers
 Thorsten Schneider
 Three Arrows Capital
 Three Legs Cooling Water
 Three Little Wishes
 Three Wishes (Singaporean TV series)
 Three Women and A Half
 Threshold issues in Singapore administrative law
 Thum Ping Tjin
 Thunder Plot
 Thung Syn Neo
 Théo Raymond
 Ti-Sarana Buddhist Association
 Tien Wong
 Tier One Entertainment
 Tierra Design
 Tiga Abdul
 Tiger
 Tiger Airways Holdings
 Tiger Balm
 Tiger Beer
 Tiger Mum
 Tiger Sky Tower
 Tiger parenting
 Tigerair
 Tila Tequila
 Tilting Our Plates to Catch the Light
 Tim David
 Tim Nolan
 Timeless Gift
 Timeless Love (film)
 Timeline of Singaporean history
 Timeline of the COVID-19 pandemic in Singapore
 Timeline of the COVID-19 pandemic in Singapore (2020)
 Timeline of the COVID-19 pandemic in Singapore (2021)
 Timeline of the COVID-19 pandemic in Singapore (2022)
 Times Bookstores
 Timo Scheunemann
 Timothee Yap Jin Wei
 Timothy A. Chorba
 Timothy Nga
 Timothy Seow
 Timothy Tow
 Timothy Yeo (footballer)
 Timur Pradopo
 Tin Jingyao
 Tin Pei Ling
 Tiny Island Productions
 Tiong Bahru
 Tiong Bahru Galicier Pastry
 Tiong Bahru Group Representation Constituency
 Tiong Bahru MRT station
 Tiong Bahru Park
 Tiong Bahru Plaza
 Tiong Bahru Secondary School
 Tiong Bahru Single Member Constituency
 Tiong Bahru Social Club
 Tiong Bahru bus hijacking
 Titan (esports)
 Tito Karnavian
 Titoudao
 Titus Chung
 Titus Lowe
 To Be Continued... (Stefanie Sun album)
 To Singapore, With Love
 Toa Payoh
 Toa Payoh Bus Interchange
 Toa Payoh Constituency
 Toa Payoh Dragon Playground
 Toa Payoh Group Representation Constituency
 Toa Payoh Hospital
 Toa Payoh MRT station
 Toa Payoh Police Station
 Toa Payoh Public Library
 Toa Payoh Sports Hall
 Toa Payoh Stadium
 Toa Payoh Swimming Complex
 Toa Payoh Town Park
 Toa Payoh United
 Toa Payoh ritual murders
 Today (Singapore newspaper)
 Together (Singaporean TV series)
 Togo at the 2010 Summer Youth Olympics
 Toh Ah Boon
 Toh Chin Chye
 Toh Guan MRT station
 Toh Guo'An
 Toh Hsien Min
 Toh Kai Wei
 Toh Kian Chui
 Toh Liying
 Toh Tuck
 Toh Wei Soong
 Tokyo Convention
 Tokyo Square
 Tolaram Group
 Tom Clancy's Ghost Recon Phantoms
 Tom English (footballer, born 1981)
 Tom Hahl
 Tom Phillips (Royal Navy officer)
 Tomislav Steinbrückner
 Tommy Koh
 Tommy Turnbull
 Tomoki Menda
 Tomoyuki Doi
 Tomoyuki Yamashita
 Tong Bing Yu
 Tong Ching Man
 Tonga at the 2010 Summer Youth Olympics
 Tongkang
 Tongkang LRT station
 Tony Dumper
 Tony Kern
 Tony Tan
 Tony Tan Lay Thiam
 Tony Tay
 Tony Then
 Tony To
 Top Chef: D.C.
 Top Glove
 Topaz Winters
 Toribash
 Tormod Cappelen Endresen
 Tosh Zhang
 Toshiyuki Takano
 Total Defence (Singapore)
 Totchtawan Sripan
 Toto (lottery)
 Tou Mu Kung Temple
 Touch Screen Cuisine
 Tourism (film)
 Tourism in Singapore
 Tournament of Minds
 Tow Ubukata
 Tower Transit Singapore
 Town Council (Singapore)
 Trace Sport Stars
 TraceTogether
 Tracey Tan
 Track gauge in Singapore
 Tracy Lee (actress)
 TradeGecko
 Traditional boat race at the 2015 Southeast Asian Games
 Trafigura
 Trams in Singapore
 Trans-Pacific Partnership
 Trans-Pacific Strategic Economic Partnership Agreement
 Transboundary Haze Pollution Act 2014
 Transformers: The Ride 3D
 Transgender people in Singapore
 Transport (Singapore Army)
 Transport Safety Investigation Bureau
 Transport in Singapore
 Tras Street
 Trax Retail
 Treasure Hunters (Universal Studios Singapore)
 Treaty of Amity and Cooperation in Southeast Asia
 Treaty of Bern
 Treaty on the Non-Proliferation of Nuclear Weapons
 Tree conservation areas in Singapore
 Treelodge@Punggol
 Trek 2000 International
 Trengganu Street
 Trese (TV series)
 Trevor Hartley
 Trevvy
 Triathlon at the 2010 Summer Youth Olympics
 Triathlon at the 2010 Summer Youth Olympics – Boys'
 Triathlon at the 2010 Summer Youth Olympics – Girls'
 Triathlon at the 2010 Summer Youth Olympics – Mixed relay
 Triathlon at the 2015 Southeast Asian Games
 Tribulations of Life
 Trim and Fit
 Trimeresurus purpureomaculatus
 Trimeresurus sumatranus
 Trinidad and Tobago at the 2010 Summer Youth Olympics
 Trinity Theological College, Singapore
 Tripartite Consultation (International Labour Standards) Convention, 1976
 Triple Nine (TV series)
 Trisno
 Troides helena
 Trolleybuses in Singapore
 Trouze
 True Files
 True Files (film)
 True Heroes (TV series)
 True Singapore Ghost Stories
 Trung Nguyên
 Tsao Chieh
 Tsubasa Kawanishi
 Tsubasa Sano
 Tsung Yeh
 Tua Pek Kong
 Tuas
 Tuas Biomedical Park
 Tuas Bus Terminal
 Tuas Crescent MRT station
 Tuas Depot
 Tuas Link MRT station
 Tuas Naval Base
 Tuas North
 Tuas View
 Tuas West Road MRT station
 Tuition centre
 Tukang MRT station
 Tung Chye Hong
 Tung Soo Hua
 Tunisia at the 2010 Summer Youth Olympics
 Turf City MRT station
 Turkey at the 2010 Summer Youth Olympics
 Turkmenistan at the 2010 Summer Youth Olympics
 Turn Left, Turn Right
 Tutoring agency
 Tuvalu at the 2010 Summer Youth Olympics
 Twelve Cupcakes
 Twenty-Fifth Army (Japan)
 Twilight Kitchen
 Twinkletoes (book series)
 Twins (By2 album)
 Twisted Logic Tour
 TwoSet Violin
 Tyersall Park
 Tzang Merwyn Tong
 Tze char
 Tzu Chi Singapore

U

 U. K. Shyam
 UFC 275
 UFC Fight Night: Cowboy vs. Edwards
 UFC Fight Night: Holm vs. Correia
 UFC Fight Night: Maia vs. Askren
 UFC Fight Night: Saffiedine vs. Lim
 UFM100.3
 UIC Building
 UOA Group
 UOB Plaza
 UOB-Kay Hian
 UOL Group
 USS Holmes County (LST-836)
 USS John S. McCain and Alnic MC collision
 USS Kopara (AK-62)
 USS LST-579
 USS LST-613
 USS LST-629
 USS LST-649
 USS Thrasher (AMS-203)
 USS Whippoorwill (AMS-207)
 UTAC Group
 UTC+07:20
 UTC+07:30
 UTC+08:00
 Ubi MRT station
 Ubin–Khatib Important Bird Area
 Ubisoft Singapore
 Udaya Soundari
 Udayam (TV series)
 Udders (ice cream)
 Uganda at the 2010 Summer Youth Olympics
 Ukraine at the 2010 Summer Youth Olympics
 Ultimate Magic
 Ultimax 100
 Ultra (Malaysia)
 Ultra Singapore
 Ulu Bedok Constituency
 Ulu Pandan Bus Depot
 Ulu Pandan Depot
 Ulu Pandan Single Member Constituency
 Umar Pulavar Tamil Language Centre
 Umar Ramle
 Umar Rana
 UnPAY
 Unclassified (Derrick Hoh album)
 Under One Roof (Singapore TV series)
 Underground Ammunition Facility
 Underground Work (Women) Convention, 1935
 Underwater World, Singapore
 Undesirable Publications Act
 Unemployment Convention, 1919
 Unemployment Indemnity (Shipwreck) Convention, 1920
 Unified-Inbox
 Uniforms of the Singapore Police Force
 Unit 9420
 United Arab Emirates at the 2010 Summer Youth Olympics
 United Envirotech
 United Malays National Organisation
 United Nations (Rui En album)
 United Nations Convention Against Corruption
 United Nations Convention Against Illicit Traffic in Narcotic Drugs and Psychotropic Substances
 United Nations Convention Against Transnational Organized Crime
 United Nations Convention on Contracts for the International Sale of Goods
 United Nations Convention on the Law of the Sea
 United Nations Convention to Combat Desertification
 United Nations Framework Convention on Climate Change
 United Nations Security Council Resolution 213
 United Overseas Bank
 United People's Party (Singapore)
 United States at the 2010 Summer Youth Olympics
 United States presidential visits to Southeast Asia
 United World College of South East Asia
 Universal Express Pass
 Universal Studios Singapore
 Universal's Halloween Horror Nights
 University of New South Wales Asia
 University of the Arts Singapore
 Unlucky Plaza
 Unmanned aircraft in Singapore
 Unmarked Treasure
 Unriddle
 Unriddle 2
 Upper Changi MRT station
 Upper Cross Street
 Upper Peirce Reservoir
 Upper Peirce Reservoir Park
 Upper Seletar Reservoir
 Upper Serangoon Constituency
 Upper Thomson (subzone)
 Upper Thomson MRT station
 Urban Redevelopment Authority
 Urban planning in Singapore
 Uruguay at the 2010 Summer Youth Olympics
 Usman Haji Muhammad Ali
 Utsav Rakshit
 Uwe Klima
 Uzbekistan at the 2010 Summer Youth Olympics

V

 V on Shenton
 V-Key
 V. K. Rajah
 V. R. Gopala Pillai
 V. Selvaraj
 V. Sundramoorthy
 V. T. Arasu
 VR Man
 Valen Low
 Valery Hiek
 Vallamai Tharayo (TV series)
 Valuair
 Van Kleef Aquarium
 Van Tuong Nguyen
 Vanda Miss Joaquim (drag queen)
 Vandalism Act
 Vandeleur Molyneux Grayburn
 Vanessa Fernandez
 Vanessa Marie Lee
 Vanessa Neo
 Vanessa Peh
 Vanessa Shih
 Vanessa-Mae
 Vanilla aphylla
 Vannathirai
 Vanu Gopala Menon
 Vanuatu at the 2010 Summer Youth Olympics
 Vasantham (TV channel)
 Vasile Ghindaru
 Vatica ridleyana
 Vedran Mesec
 VeganBurg
 Vegetarian Society (Singapore)
 Vegetarian bee hoon
 Vehicle registration plates of Singapore
 Velimir Crljen
 Vellama d/o Marie Muthu v. Attorney-General
 Vellupillai Devadas
 Velyki Perehony
 Venezuela at the 2010 Summer Youth Olympics
 Venues of the 2010 Summer Youth Olympics
 Veredus Laboratories
 Veresa Toma
 Vernetta Lopez
 Vertex Holdings
 Vertical Submarine
 Vesak
 Vetro Energy
 Vettai (TV series)
 Vettai: Pledged to Hunt
 Vice admiral
 Victor Cui
 Victor Dzau
 Victor Oh
 Victoria Chan-Palay
 Victoria Junior College
 Victoria Lee
 Victoria Loke
 Victoria School
 Victoria Street, Singapore
 Victoria Theatre and Concert Hall
 Victory-class corvette
 Viddsee
 Vidfish
 Vienna Convention for the Protection of the Ozone Layer
 Vienna Convention on Consular Relations
 Vienna Convention on Diplomatic Relations
 Vietnam at the 2010 Summer Youth Olympics
 Vietnam at the 2015 Southeast Asian Games
 View Road Hospital
 ViewQwest
 Viivi Avellan
 Vikram Nair
 Vilasini Menon
 VinFast
 Vina Jie-Min Prasad
 Vincent Bezecourt
 Vincent Cheng Kim Chuan
 Vincent Chua
 Vincent Lee Chuan Leong
 Vincent Ng
 Vincent Salas
 Vincent Subramaniam
 Vincent Wijeysingha
 Vincy Chan
 Vindula dejone
 Vinoth Baskaran
 Vintage Camera Museum
 Vinyl of the day
 Violet Hamilton
 Violet Oon
 Violet Sleigh
 Vipassana Meditation Centre
 Virgin Australia Holdings
 Virgin Islands at the 2010 Summer Youth Olympics
 Virtuos
 Visa policy of Singapore
 Visa requirements for Singaporean citizens
 Vishwaroopam
 Vistara
 Visual art of Singapore
 Viswa Sadasivan
 Vitor Borges
 Viva Le Famille
 Viva la Vida Tour
 Vivek A. Kumar
 Vivek Vedagiri
 Vivian Balakrishnan
 Vivian Dawson
 Vivian Gordon Bowden
 Vivian Lai
 VivoCity
 Viwawa
 Vjeran Simunić
 Vladan Seric
 Vlado Bozinovski
 Vocaluptuous
 Voco Orchard Singapore
 Vodien Internet Solutions
 Vogue Singapore
 Voices (Wormrot album)
 Void deck
 Volleyball at the 2010 Summer Youth Olympics
 Volleyball at the 2010 Summer Youth Olympics – Boys' tournament
 Volleyball at the 2010 Summer Youth Olympics – Girls' tournament
 Volleyball at the 2015 Southeast Asian Games
 Volodymyr Pryyomov
 Volume Interactions
 Volunteer Special Constabulary
 Vorawan Chitavanich
 Voting rights in Singapore
 Vue Privée
 Vuestar Technologies
 Vuk Sotirović
 Vyvyane Loh
 Víctor Coto
 Vítor Ladeiras
 Võ Văn Kiệt

W

 W!LD RICE
 WHO Framework Convention on Tobacco Control
 WIPO Convention
 WIPO Copyright Treaty
 WIPO Performances and Phonograms Treaty
 WOHA
 WS Audiology
 WTA Singapore Open
 Wafi Aminuddin
 Wah Kee
 Wahid Satay
 Wahyudi Wahid
 Waldemar Dubaniowski
 Walid Lounis
 Walk-in Selection
 Walker Panel
 Wall-roosting mouse-eared bat
 Walter Ardone
 Walter Egerton
 Walter Handmer
 Walter Randolph Carpenter
 Walter Woon
 Wan Azizah Wan Ismail
 Wan Rizal Wan Zakariah
 Wan Soon Bee
 Wan Zack Haikal
 Wandly Yazid
 Wang Anyi
 Wang Gungwu
 Wang Hao (footballer, born 1989)
 Wang Sa
 Wang Weiliang
 Wang Xiaolong (footballer, born 1989)
 Wang Xiuyun
 Wang Yuegu
 Wang Yuqing
 Wang Zheng (newsreader)
 Wang-Chiew Tan
 Wang–Koo summit
 War Memorial Park, Singapore
 War in Afghanistan (2001–2021)
 Warna 94.2FM
 Warner Bros. Discovery Asia-Pacific
 Warong Nasi Pariaman
 Warrant officer
 Warren Spink
 Warriors FC
 Warsaw Convention
 Warta Malaya
 Waseda Shibuya Senior High School
 Wat Ananda Metyarama Thai Buddhist Temple
 Wat Ananda Youth
 Wataru Murofushi
 Water Wally
 Water conflicts between Malaysia and Singapore
 Water polo at the 2015 Southeast Asian Games
 Water polo at the 2015 Southeast Asian Games – Men's tournament
 Water polo at the 2015 Southeast Asian Games – Women's tournament
 Water supply and sanitation in Singapore
 Waterboat House Garden
 Waterloo Street
 Waterskiing at the 2015 Southeast Asian Games
 Waterway Point
 Waterworld: A Live Sea War Spectacular
 Wawa Pictures
 Wayne Chew
 Wayne O'Sullivan
 We Are Singaporeans
 We Not Naughty
 Wednesbury unreasonableness in Singapore law
 Wee Ah Hood
 Wee Bin
 Wee Bin & Co.
 Wee Boon Teck
 Wee Cho Yaw
 Wee Chong Jin
 Wee Ee Cheong
 Wee Kim Wee
 Wee Li Lin
 Wee Siew Kim
 Wee Tian Siak
 Wee-Lek Chew
 Weer Rajendra Rishi
 Wego.com
 Wei Long Wong
 Weightlifting at the 2010 Summer Youth Olympics
 Weightlifting at the 2010 Summer Youth Olympics – Boys' +85 kg
 Weightlifting at the 2010 Summer Youth Olympics – Boys' 56 kg
 Weightlifting at the 2010 Summer Youth Olympics – Boys' 62 kg
 Weightlifting at the 2010 Summer Youth Olympics – Boys' 69 kg
 Weightlifting at the 2010 Summer Youth Olympics – Boys' 77 kg
 Weightlifting at the 2010 Summer Youth Olympics – Boys' 85 kg
 Weightlifting at the 2010 Summer Youth Olympics – Girls' +63 kg
 Weightlifting at the 2010 Summer Youth Olympics – Girls' 48 kg
 Weightlifting at the 2010 Summer Youth Olympics – Girls' 53 kg
 Weightlifting at the 2010 Summer Youth Olympics – Girls' 58 kg
 Weightlifting at the 2010 Summer Youth Olympics – Girls' 63 kg
 Weisi Lin
 Welcome Home, My Love
 Wen Ken Group
 Wena Poon
 Wendy Kweh
 Wenya
 Wes Fang
 Wesley Methodist Church, Singapore
 West Coast Constituency
 West Coast Group Representation Constituency
 West Coast Highway, Singapore
 West Coast MRT station
 West Coast Park
 West Coast Plaza
 West Coast, Singapore
 West Mall
 West Region, Singapore
 West Spring Secondary School
 Western Islands, Singapore
 Western Union Band
 Western Water Catchment
 Westgate, Singapore
 Westside (album)
 Westwood Secondary School
 Westworld (season 3)
 Wet Season (film)
 Wetterling Teo Gallery
 Weyhill Preparatory School
 Whampoa Dragon Fountain
 Whampoa Makan Place
 Whampoa Secondary School
 Whampoa Single Member Constituency
 Whampoa's Ice House
 Whampoa, Singapore
 Wharf Estates Singapore
 What! The Heist
 What's In The Fridge?
 Wheelchair basketball at the 2015 ASEAN Para Games
 Wheelock Place
 When Duty Calls
 When Ghost Meets Zombie
 Where (magazine)
 Where Got Ghost?
 Where I Belong (Tanya Chua song)
 Where the Heart Is (2008 TV series)
 While We Are Young
 White Sands Shopping Mall, Singapore
 White Spot
 Whitley Secondary School
 Wiebe Wolters
 Wild Wild Wet
 Wildlife of Singapore
 Wilfred Hamilton-Shimmen
 Wilfred Lawson Blythe
 Wilfred Skinner
 Will You (Singaporean song)
 William A. Pickering
 William Allmond Codrington Goode
 William C. F. Robinson
 William Cameron (explorer)
 William Dobbie
 William Edward Maxwell
 William Farquhar
 William Farquhar Collection of Natural History Drawings
 William George Stirling
 William Goh
 William Haxworth
 William Henry Macleod Read
 William Hood Treacher
 William Jervois
 William John Butterworth
 William Klippgen
 William N. Brewster
 William Napier (lawyer)
 William S. W. Lim
 William Sampson (author)
 William Scorpion
 William Tan
 William Thomas Taylor
 William Willetts (art historian)
 Willie Phua
 Willie Tann
 Willin Low
 Willughbeia angustifolia
 Wilmar International
 Wilmar Sugar Australia
 Wilson Grosset
 Wilson Raj Perumal
 Windsor Nature Park
 Wing Tai Properties Limited
 Winston Choo
 Winston Yap
 Wireless@SG
 Wisdom Onyekwere
 Wishes (TV series)
 Wisma Atria
 With Hands United
 With You (Singaporean TV series)
 Woffles Wu
 Wok of Life
 Women in Singapore
 Women in Singapore politics
 Women of Times
 Women's Charter
 Women's Premier League (Singapore)
 WomenTalkTV
 Wonder Boy (film)
 Wonderful! Liang Xi Mei
 Wong Ah Fook
 Wong Hong Mok
 Wong Jeh Shyan
 Wong Jinglun
 Wong Kah Chun
 Wong Kan Seng
 Wong Kay Poh
 Wong Keen
 Wong Kim Poh
 Wong Li Lin
 Wong Liang Hun
 Wong May
 Wong Meng Kong
 Wong Ngit Liong
 Wong Peng Soon
 Wong Shoon Keat
 Wong Wee Nam
 Wong Yew Tong
 Wong Yip Yan
 Wong-Lee Siok Tin
 Wonton
 Wonton noodles
 Woo Bih Li
 Woodlands Bus Depot
 Woodlands Bus Interchange
 Woodlands Checkpoint
 Woodlands MRT station
 Woodlands North MRT station
 Woodlands Police Division
 Woodlands Regional Library
 Woodlands South MRT station
 Woodlands Stadium
 Woodlands Train Checkpoint
 Woodlands Waterfront Park
 Woodlands Wellington FC
 Woodlands double murders
 Woodlands railway station, Singapore
 Woodlands, Singapore
 Woodleigh MRT station
 Woodsville Interchange
 Woon Sui Kut
 Woon Tai Ho
 Wopke Hoekstra
 Workers' Party (Singapore)
 Workforce Singapore
 Workforce Skills Qualifications
 Workmen's Compensation (Agriculture) Convention, 1921
 Workplace Safety and Health Act
 Workplace Safety and Health Council
 Workplace safety and health in Singapore
 World Architecture Festival
 World Classic Championship
 World Cultural Council 30th Award Ceremony
 World Cyber Games 2005
 World Film Carnival Singapore
 World Gourmet Summit
 World Heritage Convention
 World Scientific
 World Sport Group
 World Toilet Organization
 World Trade Organization Ministerial Conference of 1996
 World at Your Feet (TV series)
 World of Soccer Cup
 Wormrot
 Worshippers of the Seventh Tyranny
 Worst Forms of Child Labour Convention
 Wrestling Federation of Singapore
 Wrestling at the 2010 Summer Youth Olympics
 Wrestling at the 2010 Summer Youth Olympics – Boys' Greco-Roman 42 kg
 Wrestling at the 2010 Summer Youth Olympics – Boys' Greco-Roman 50 kg
 Wrestling at the 2010 Summer Youth Olympics – Boys' Greco-Roman 58 kg
 Wrestling at the 2010 Summer Youth Olympics – Boys' Greco-Roman 69 kg
 Wrestling at the 2010 Summer Youth Olympics – Boys' Greco-Roman 85 kg
 Wrestling at the 2010 Summer Youth Olympics – Boys' freestyle 100 kg
 Wrestling at the 2010 Summer Youth Olympics – Boys' freestyle 46 kg
 Wrestling at the 2010 Summer Youth Olympics – Boys' freestyle 54 kg
 Wrestling at the 2010 Summer Youth Olympics – Boys' freestyle 63 kg
 Wrestling at the 2010 Summer Youth Olympics – Boys' freestyle 76 kg
 Wrestling at the 2010 Summer Youth Olympics – Girls' freestyle 46 kg
 Wrestling at the 2010 Summer Youth Olympics – Girls' freestyle 52 kg
 Wrestling at the 2010 Summer Youth Olympics – Girls' freestyle 60 kg
 Wrestling at the 2010 Summer Youth Olympics – Girls' freestyle 70 kg
 Written Hokkien
 Wu Lien-teh
 Wu Shaobin
 Wu Teh Yao
 Wu Yili
 Wuon-Gean Ho
 Wushu at the 2015 Southeast Asian Games
 Wushu in Singapore
 Wywy Group of Companies

X

 X-Press Feeders
 X-Press Pearl
 X-mini
 XFM 96.3
 Xavier Alexander
 Xavier Ong
 Xian Jun Loh
 Xiang Yun
 Xiao Luxi
 Xiaohan (lyricist)
 Xiaxue
 Xie Shaoguang
 Xie Yao Quan
 Xilin MRT station
 Xing Aiying
 Xinmin Secondary School
 Xinmsn
 Xinyao
 Xinyi Tan
 Xseed education
 Xu Bin
 Xu Huaiji
 Xu Yan (table tennis)
 Xu Yuan Zhen
 Xylocopa aestuans
 Xylocopa caerulea
 Xylocopa latipes
 Xylopia magna

Y

 YES 933
 YHI International
 YMCA Building, Singapore
 Ya Hui
 Ya Kun Kaya Toast
 Yaacob Ibrahim
 Yaar? (TV series)
 Yael Rubinstein
 YakiniQuest
 Yakob Hashim
 Yale-NUS College
 Yam Ah Mee
 Yam ring
 Yan Bingliang
 Yan Kit Swimming Complex
 Yan Zi (album)
 Yang Libing
 Yang Lina (actress)
 Yang Mu (footballer)
 Yang Yun (footballer, born 1989)
 Yang Zi (table tennis)
 Yang di-Pertuan Negara
 Yann Motta
 Yao Lei
 Yao Wenlong
 Yap Weng Wah
 Yardbird Southern Table & Bar
 Yasir Hanapi
 Yasuhiro Hanada
 Yasuhiro Yamakoshi
 Yasutaka Yanagi
 Yaw Shin Leong
 Yazid Yasin
 Ye Fong
 Ye Shaonan
 Ye Shipin
 Yee Jenn Jong
 Yee Tit Kwan
 Yee-Sin Leo
 Yeh Chi Yun
 Yellow Ribbon Project
 Yellow Ribbon Singapore
 Yemen at the 2010 Summer Youth Olympics
 Yeng Pway Ngon
 Yenn Wong
 Yeo Cheow Tong
 Yeo Gek Huat
 Yeo Guat Kwang
 Yeo Hai Ngee
 Yeo Hiap Seng
 Yeo Jia Min
 Yeo Kian Chye
 Yeo Kiat Seng
 Yeo Ning Hong
 Yeo Tiong Min
 Yeo Wan Ling
 Yeoh Ghim Seng
 Yeow Kai Chai
 Yes We Can! (TV series)
 Yeule
 Yew Lian Park
 Yew Tee
 Yew Tee MRT station
 Yi bua
 Yida Huang
 Ying Fo Fui Kun
 Yio Chu Kang
 Yio Chu Kang Bus Interchange
 Yio Chu Kang MRT station
 Yio Chu Kang Secondary School
 Yio Chu Kang Single Member Constituency
 Yio Chu Kang Stadium
 Yip Cheong Fun
 Yip Hon Weng
 Yip Pin Xiu
 Yishun
 Yishun Bus Interchange
 Yishun Community Hospital
 Yishun Innova Junior College
 Yishun MRT station
 Yishun Neighbourhood Park
 Yishun Park
 Yishun Pond Park
 Yishun Public Library
 Yishun Secondary School
 Yishun Sentek Mariners FC
 Yishun Stadium
 Yishun Town Secondary School
 Yishun infant murder
 Yishun triple murders
 Yogesh Mohan Tiwari
 Yohann Lacroix
 Yong Loo Lin School of Medicine
 Yong Nyuk Lin
 Yong Pung How
 Yong Pung How School of Law
 Yong Shu Hoong
 Yong Siew Toh Conservatory of Music
 Yong Vui Kong
 Yong Vui Kong v Public Prosecutor
 Yong tau foo
 Yoo Hyun-goo
 Yoshikatsu Hiraga
 Yoshiki Matsuura
 Yoshiko Mibuchi
 Yoshinaga Arima
 Yoshinobu Matsumura
 Yoshinoya
 Yoshitaka Komori
 Yosuke Nakagawa
 You Are the One (Singaporean TV series)
 You Can Be an Angel 2
 You Can Be an Angel Too
 You Jin
 Young & Fabulous
 Young Justice Bao
 Young Lions FC
 Young Out Here
 Young Women Muslim Association of Singapore
 Youngor Sevelee Telewoda
 Your Hand In Mine
 Yours Fatefully
 Youtiao
 Youyi (actress)
 Ypthima baldus
 Ypthima huebneri
 Yu Mengyu
 Yu Shuran
 Yu Tianzhu
 Yu Tokiwa
 Yu-Foo Yee Shoon
 Yuan Ching Secondary School
 Yuan Shuai (actor)
 Yue Chinese
 Yue Hwa Building
 Yueh Hai Ching Temple
 Yuen Kum Fai
 Yuen Pau Woo
 Yuen Yuen Ang
 Yuexiu Property
 Yuhua Secondary School
 Yuhua Single Member Constituency
 Yuhua, Singapore
 Yuki Ichikawa
 Yummy Yummy
 Yung Raja
 Yunnan, Singapore
 Yusheng
 Yusof Ishak
 Yusof Ishak Secondary School
 Yusuke Mukai
 Yusuke Ueda
 Yuuzoo
 Yuying Secondary School
 Yvette Tsui
 Yvonne Danson
 Yvonne Lim
 Yōsuke Nozawa
 Yōsuke Saitō

Z

 ZEN V
 ZEN Vision W
 ZEN Vision:M
 Zahid Ahmad (footballer)
 Zaiful Nizam
 Zain Amat
 Zainal Sapari
 Zainol Gulam
 Zainudin Nordin
 Zainul Abidin (politician)
 Zaiton (actress)
 Zakir Jalilov
 Zalora Group
 Zamani Zamri
 Zambia at the 2010 Summer Youth Olympics
 Zaqy Mohamad
 Zarinah Abdullah
 Zaw Moe
 Zdravko Dragićević
 Zdravko Šimić
 Zehrudin Mehmedović
 Zen (portable media player)
 Zen Chong
 Zena Tessensohn
 Zeng Guoyuan
 Zeng Huifen
 Zeng Jian
 Zero (Singaporean TV series)
 Zero to Hero (TV series)
 Zeuxine strateumatica
 Zhan Jian
 Zhang Boli (physician)
 Zhang Depeng
 Zhang Guirong
 Zhang Haijie
 Zhang Jingna
 Zhang Meng (footballer, born 1983)
 Zhang Xizhe
 Zhang Xueling
 Zhang Yaodong
 Zhang Ye (footballer, born 1989)
 Zhang Yong (restaurateur)
 Zhang Zetong
 Zhang Zhaohui (footballer)
 Zhang Zhong
 Zhao Wen Bei
 Zhao Yang
 Zharfan Rohaizad
 Zheng Geping
 Zhenghua Park
 Zhenghua Secondary School
 Zhong Nanshan
 Zhonghua Secondary School
 Zhou Yihan
 Zhu Houren
 Zhuan Dao
 Zhulkarnain Abdul Rahim
 Zigby
 Zii EGG
 ZiiLABS
 Zikos Chua
 Zilingo
 Zimbabwe at the 2010 Summer Youth Olympics
 Zing Tsjeng
 Zircon Lounge
 Zizina otis
 Zizula hylax
 Zodiac: The Race Begins
 Zoe Tay
 Zombie Dogs
 Zombiepura
 Zong Zijie
 Zongzi
 ZooMoo
 Zoolander
 Zoran Višić
 Zou Yucheng
 Zouk (club)
 ZoukOut
 Zsolt Bücs
 Zubir Said
 Zul Sutan
 Zulfadhmi Suzliman
 Zulfadli Zainal Abidin
 Zulfahmi Arifin
 Zulfairuuz Rudy
 Zulkarnaen Zainal
 Zulkarnain Malik
 Zulkiffli Hassim
 Zulkifli Mohammed
 Zulqarnaen Suzliman
 Zurab Azmaiparashvili
 Zuraida Kamaruddin
 Åke Sjölin
 Émile Mbouh
 Étoile FC
 Đurica Župarić
 Šime Žužul
 Željko Savić

See also

Outline of Singapore
Lists of country-related topics - similar lists for other countries

 
Singapore